= Diminished rhombic dodecahedron =

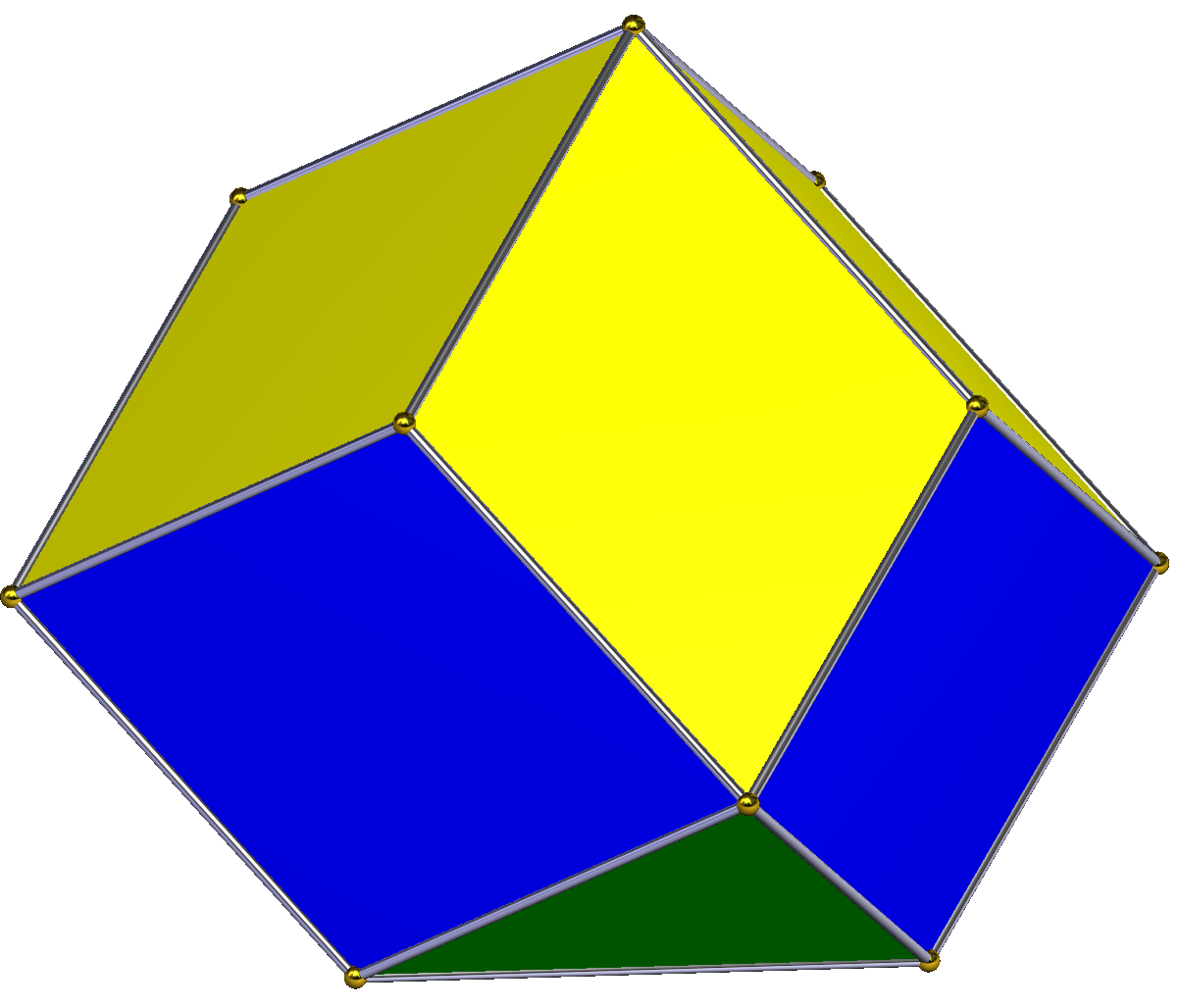
- Faces: 13: 8 rhombi 4 triangles 1 square
- Edges: 24
- Vertices: 13
- Symmetry group: C_{4v}, order 8
- Dual polyhedron: Self-dual
- Properties: convex

Net
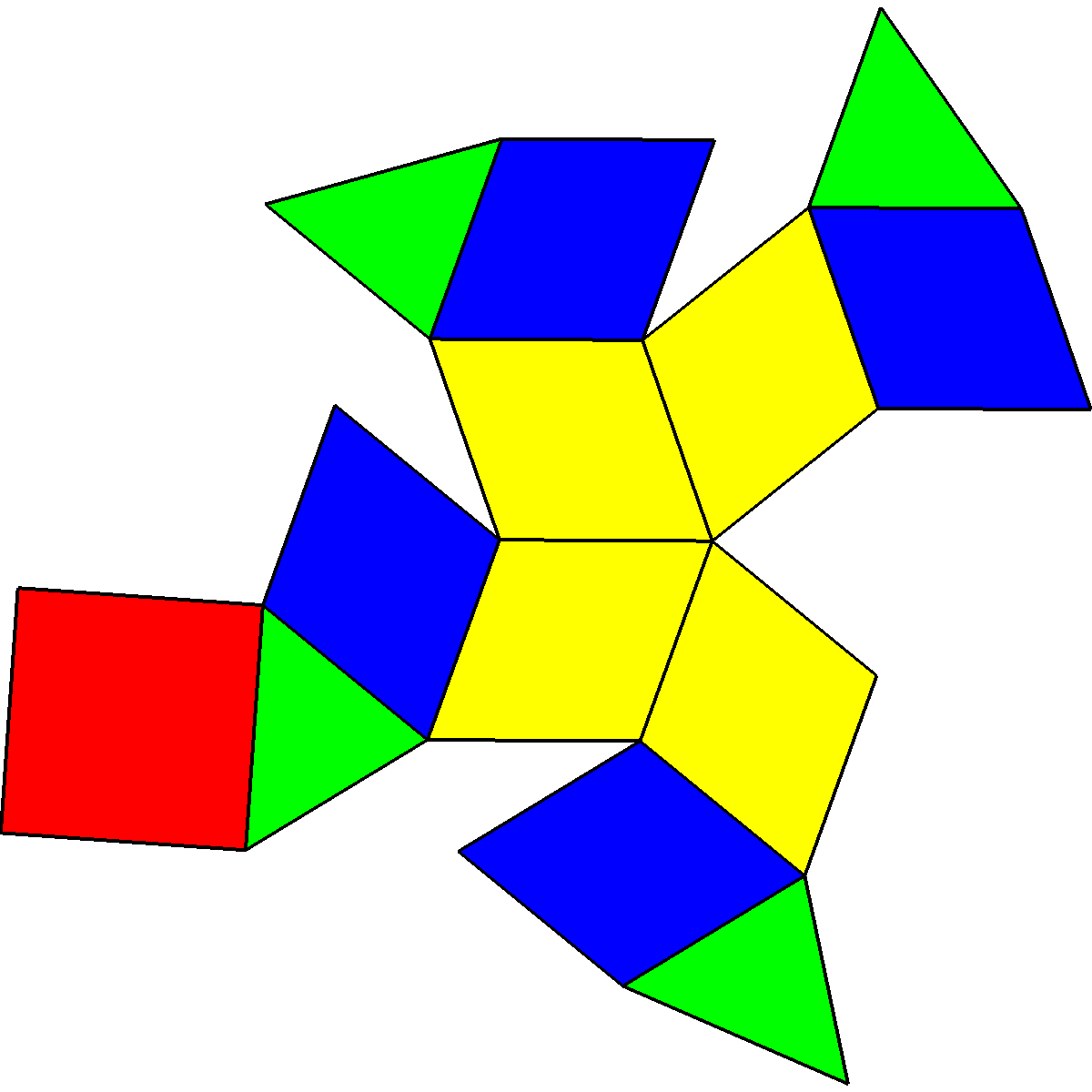

In geometry, a diminished rhombic dodecahedron is a rhombic dodecahedron with one or more vertices removed. This article describes diminishing one 4-valence vertex. This diminishment creates one new square face while 4 rhombic faces are reduced to triangles. It has 13 vertices, 24 edges, and 13 faces. It has C_{4v} symmetry, order 8.

Like the rhombic dodecahedron, the long diagonal of each rhombic face is √2 times the length of the short diagonal, so that the acute angles on each face measure arccos(1/3), or approximately 70.53°.

== Self-dual ==
Like the dihedral symmetry pyramids, and elongated pyramids, it is self-dual, with the dual geometry inverted across the axis of symmetry. It is one of three self-dual tridecahedra with C_{4v} symmetry.

== Space-filling ==
This polyhedron along with the cube is space-filling, like the rhombic dodecahedral honeycomb. Six diminished points come together to form cubic holes.

== Cartesian coordinate ==
It has 13 of 14 Cartesian coordinates of the rhombic dodecahedron are:

8: (±1, ±1, ±1)
1: (2, 0, 0)
2: (0, ±2, 0)
2: (0, 0, ±2)

== Augmented cuboctahedron ==
The same topological polyhedron with different proportions can be constructed as an augmented cuboctahedron, with a square face augmented by a square pyramid. This construction requires merging of neighboring coparallel triangular faces into new 60° rhombic faces. This can also be seen as an asymmetric stellation of a cuboctahedron. It retains 5 square faces, and 4 equilateral triangle faces of the cuboctahedron.

Augmented cuboctahedron	Net

The 13 Cartesian coordinate can be positioned as:

1: ( 2, 0, 0)
4: (±1, ±1, 0)
4: (±1, 0, ±1)
4: ( 0, ±1, ±1)

Augmenting two opposite squares will create a dihedral rhombic dodecahedron, doubling the symmetry to D_{4h} symmetry, order 16. Augmenting pyramids on all six square faces, with merged faces will produce a regular octahedron, restoring full octahedral symmetry, order 48.
