= Needle Threading A Button =

Sculpture in New York

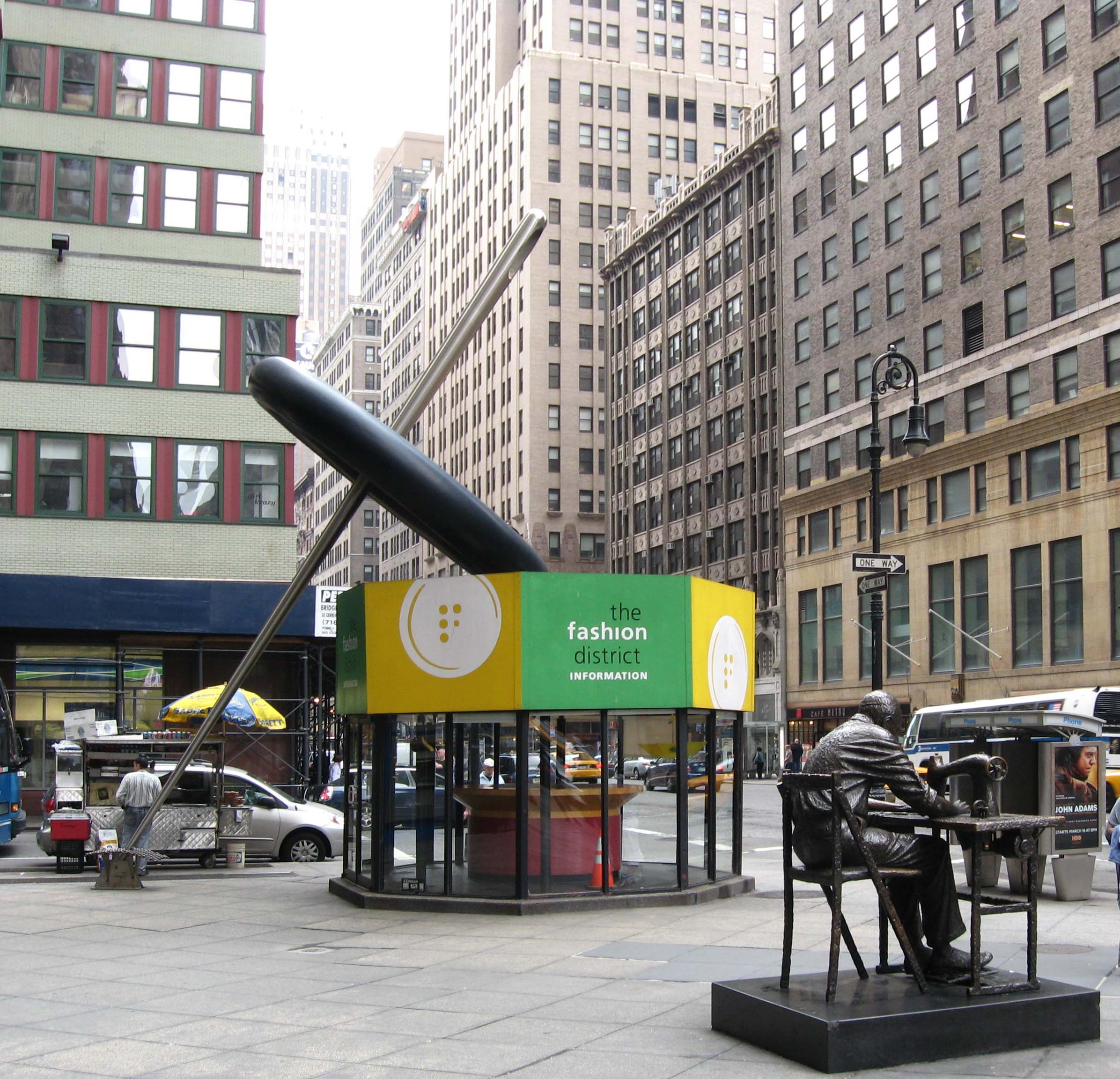
- The sculpture behind the kiosk in 2008, prior to its redesign

- Location within Manhattan Location within New York Location within the United States
- Artist: Local Projects and UAP Company
- Completion date: February 16, 2023
- Medium: Stainless steel (needle and thread); Alumninum (button)
- Movement: Pop art
- Subject: Sewing needle and button
- Dimensions: 28 ft (8.5 m) tall overall; 32 ft (9.8 m) (needle length); 15 ft (4.6 m) (button diameter)
- Location: Manhattan, New York; 40.7542°N 73.9880°W
- Owner: Garment District Alliance

Needle Threading A Button is a public sculpture in the Garment District neighborhood of Manhattan, New York, located on 191 W 39th St. It is owned by the Garment District Alliance. It is the district's first permanent art installation, being made out of stainless steel and aluminum.

== History ==
The kiosk, which previously accompanied the sculpture and was a resource for information, was created in the 1970s by James Biber, on the Seventh Avenue Plaza of 1411 Broadway. It was renovated in 1996, adding the button and needle sculpture, with the purpose of attracting attention to the kiosk.

In 2021, the Garment District Alliance realized that a physical kiosk was no longer necessary due to the prevalence of cell phones, and covered it up, making it a pincushion, later fully replacing the kiosk in 2022. The small building was removed, allowing people to be able to walk underneath the sculpture, also improving mobility. In addition to the removal of the kiosk, a new sculpture with a yellow button was created. It opened on February 16, 2023, in a celebration with custom Big Button cookies.
