= Nanette Lepore =

American fashion designer

- Born: January 1, 1964 (age 62); Youngstown, Ohio, US
- Education: Fashion Institute of Technology Youngstown State University
- Website: www.nanettelepore.com

Nanette Lepore (born January 1, 1964) is an American fashion designer based in New York City. New York magazine has said that "her Romani-influenced designs are feminine and youthful. The looks are full of bold colors and bright prints, with ruffles and lace that manage to look good-time-girly but not overly frilly."

== Biography ==
Nanette Lepore moved from Ohio to New York City, where she began to develop her professional career as a designer. She attended New York's Fashion Institute of Technology and graduated with a degree in design. Prior to moving to New York City, Nanette also earned an undergraduate degree from Youngstown State University.

== Career ==
Nanette Lepore gained celebrity in the fashion world after she returned to California, opening a boutique store in Los Angeles and selling her outfits to clients in Europe and Asia. She also began to have her items featured in the American store chain, Neiman Marcus. She also gained renown for her flair on the runway and began to attract stars like Aida Turturro, Illeana Douglas, Lorraine Bracco, Eva Longoria, Kerry Washington, and America Ferrera.

She has her own fragrance named Nanette.

In spring 2007, Nanette Lepore launched a collection of shoes with Keds. Mischa Barton was the face of the line.

In 2013, Lepore participated in Levo League's live business leader Q&A series, "Office Hours", to share advice with the site's community of young professionals.

Today, Nanette Lepore is sold across America, including Saks Fifth Avenue, Neiman Marcus, and Macy's. The brand has boutiques in Boston on Newbury Street, and in New York in Soho and Madison Avenue.

== Personal life ==
Lepore has a daughter named Violet.

Nanette is married to artist and singer Robert J. Savage.

In 2010, Nanette worked with New York politicians to help save jobs in the New York Garment District through the Save the Garment Center campaign.

In 2012, she guest-starred as a judge on Project Runway All Stars.
