= Triakis tetrahedron =

Catalan solid with 12 faces

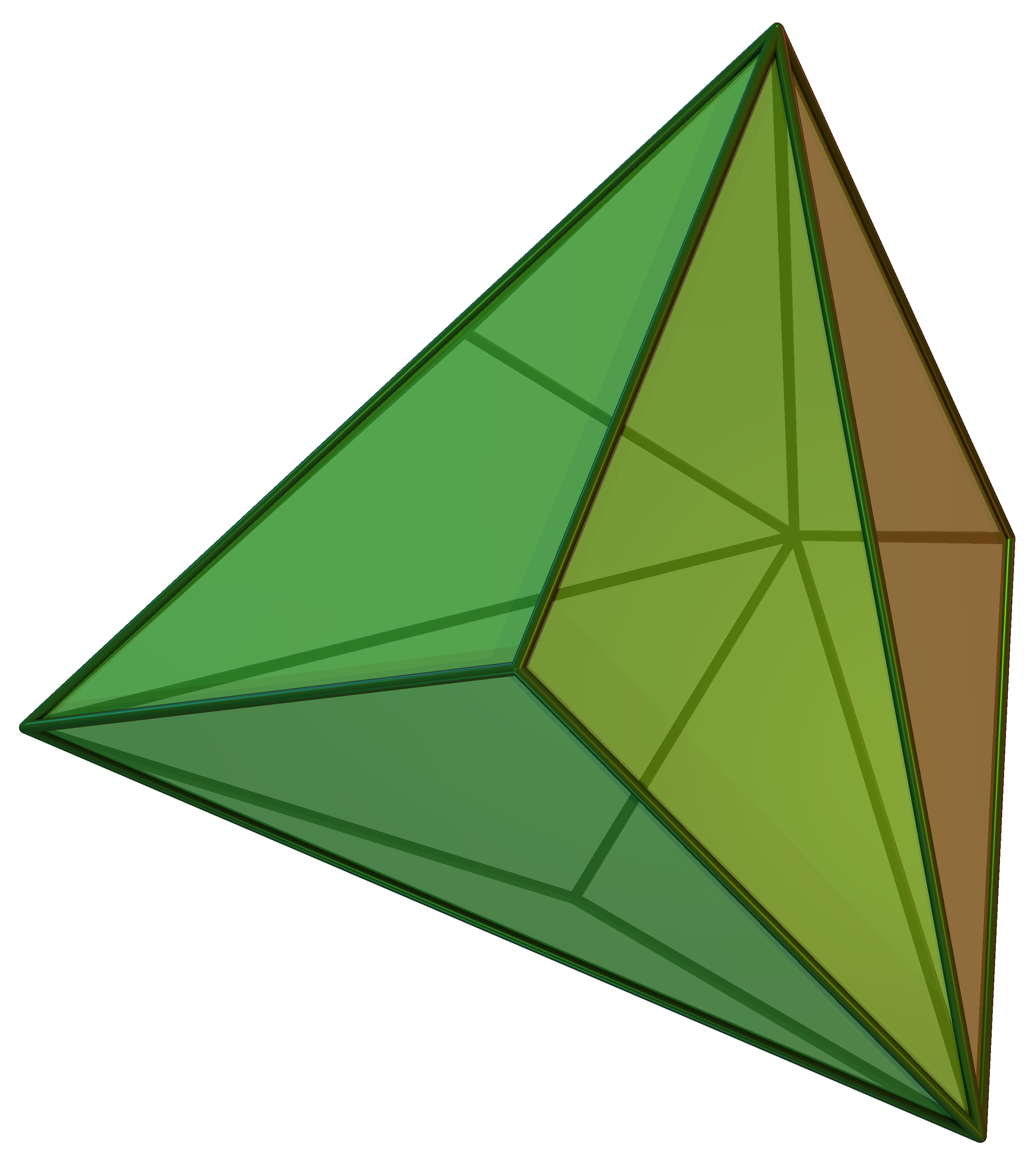
- Type: Catalan solid, Kleetope, Non-ideal
- Faces: 12
- Edges: 18
- Vertices: 8
- Symmetry group: tetrahedral symmetry $\mathrm{T}_\mathrm{d}$
- Dihedral angle (degrees): 129.52°
- Dual polyhedron: truncated tetrahedron
- Properties: convex, face-transitive, Rupert property

Net

3D model of a triakis tetrahedron

In geometry, a triakis tetrahedron (or tristetrahedron, or kistetrahedron) is a Catalan solid, constructed by attaching four triangular pyramids to a tetrahedron.

== As a Kleetope ==
The triakis tetrahedron is constructed by attaching four triangular pyramids onto the triangular faces of a regular tetrahedron, a Kleetope of a tetrahedron. This replaces the equilateral triangular faces of the regular tetrahedron with three isosceles triangles at each face, so there are twelve in total; eight vertices and eighteen edges form them. This interpretation is also expressed in the name, triakis, which is used for Kleetopes of polyhedra with triangular faces.

== As a Catalan solid ==
The triakis tetrahedron is a Catalan solid, the dual polyhedron of a truncated tetrahedron, an Archimedean solid with four hexagonal and four triangular faces, constructed by cutting off the vertices of a regular tetrahedron; it shares the same symmetry of full tetrahedral $\mathrm{T}_\mathrm{d}$. Each dihedral angle between triangular faces is $\arccos(-7/11) \approx 129.52^\circ$. Unlike its dual, the triakis tetrahedron is not vertex-transitive, but rather face-transitive, meaning its solid appearance is unchanged by any transformation like reflecting and rotation between two triangular faces. The triakis tetrahedron can pass through a copy of itself of the same size, but it is an exceptionally tight squeeze: the largest known triakis tetrahedron that can pass through is only about 1.000004 times larger.

The triakis tetrahedron is the stacked polyhedron that is a non-ideal. Combinatorially, it has independent set of exactly half the vertices but is not bipartite, so neither can be realized as an ideal polyhedron.

== Related polyhedron ==
A triakis tetrahedron is different from an augmented tetrahedron as latter is obtained by augmenting the four faces of a tetrahedron with four regular tetrahedra (instead of nonuniform triangular pyramids) resulting in an equilateral polyhedron which is a concave deltahedron (whose all faces are congruent equilateral triangles). The convex hull of an augmented tetrahedron is a triakis tetrahedron.

== See also ==
- Truncated triakis tetrahedron
