= Star unfolding =

Net obtained by cutting a polyhedron

In computational geometry, the star unfolding of a convex polyhedron is a net obtained by cutting the polyhedron along geodesics (shortest paths) through its faces. It has also been called the inward layout of the polyhedron, or the Alexandrov unfolding after Aleksandr Danilovich Aleksandrov, who first considered it.

== Description ==
In more detail, the star unfolding is obtained from a polyhedron $P$ by choosing a starting point $p$ on the surface of $P$, in general position, meaning that there is a unique shortest geodesic from $p$ to each vertex of $P$. The star polygon is obtained by cutting the surface of $P$ along these geodesics, and unfolding the resulting cut surface onto a plane. The resulting shape forms a simple polygon in the plane.

The star unfolding may be used as the basis for polynomial time algorithms for various other problems involving geodesics on convex polyhedra.

== Related unfoldings ==
The star unfolding should be distinguished from another way of cutting a convex polyhedron into a simple polygon net, the source unfolding. The source unfolding cuts the polyhedron at points that have multiple equally short geodesics to the given base point $p$, and forms a polygon with $p$ at its center, preserving geodesics from $p$. Instead, the star unfolding cuts the polyhedron along the geodesics, and forms a polygon with multiple copies of $p$ at its vertices. Despite their names, the source unfolding always produces a star-shaped polygon, but the star unfolding does not.

Generalizations of the star unfolding using a geodesic or quasigeodesic in place of a single base point have also been studied. Another generalization uses a single base point, and a system of geodesics that are not necessarily shortest geodesics.

Neither the star unfolding nor the source unfolding restrict their cuts to the edges of the polyhedron. It is an open problem whether every polyhedron can be cut and unfolded to a simple polygon using only cuts along its edges.
