= Cut locus =

Set of points where the shortest paths from a specific starting point cease to be unique

Geodesics on an ellipsoid (blue) from a single point (for flattening f = 1/10, latitude φ_{1} = −30°) form a segment of a circle of latitude; geodesic circles are shown in green and the cut locus in red.

In differential geometry, the cut locus of a point p on a manifold is the closure of the set of all other points on the manifold that are connected to p by two or more distinct shortest geodesics. More generally, the cut locus of a closed set X on the manifold is the closure of the set of all other points on the manifold connected to X by two or more distinct shortest geodesics.

== Examples ==
Cut locus C(P) of a point P on the surface of a cylinder. A point Q in the cut locus is shown with two distinct shortest paths $\gamma_1, \gamma_2$ connecting it to P.

In the Euclidean plane, a point p has an empty cut locus, because every other point is connected to p by a unique geodesic (the line segment between the points).

On the sphere, the cut locus of a point consists of the single antipodal point diametrically opposite to it.

On an infinitely long cylinder, the cut locus of a point consists of the line opposite the point.

Let X be the boundary of a simple polygon in the Euclidean plane. Then the cut locus of X in the interior of the polygon is the polygon's medial axis. Points on the medial axis are centers of disks that touch the polygon boundary at two or more points, corresponding to two or more shortest paths to the disk center.

Let x be a point on the surface of a convex polyhedron P. Then the cut locus of x on the polyhedron's surface is known as the ridge tree of P with respect to x. This ridge tree has the property that cutting the surface along its edges unfolds P to a simple planar polygon. This polygon can be viewed as a net for the polyhedron.

== Formal definition ==
Fix a point $p$ in a complete Riemannian manifold $(M,g)$, and consider the tangent space $T_pM$. It is a standard result that for sufficiently small $v$ in $T_p M$, the curve defined by the Riemannian exponential map, $\gamma(t) = \exp_p(tv)$ for $t$ belonging to the interval $[0,1]$ is a minimizing geodesic, and is the unique minimizing geodesic connecting the two endpoints. Here $\exp_p$ denotes the exponential map from $p$. The cut locus of $p$ in the tangent space is defined to be the set of all vectors $v$ in $T_pM$ such that $\gamma(t)=\exp_p(tv)$ is a minimizing geodesic for $t \in [0,1]$ but fails to be minimizing for $t = 1 + \varepsilon$ for every $\varepsilon > 0$. Thus the cut locus in the tangent space is the boundary of the set
$$\{ v\in T_pM | d(\exp_pv,p) = \|v\|\}$$
where $d$ denotes the length metric of $M$, and $\|\cdot\|$ is the Euclidean norm of $T_pM$. The cut locus of $p$ in $M$ is defined to be image of the cut locus of $p$ in the tangent space under the exponential map at $p$. Thus, we may interpret the cut locus of $p$ in $M$ as the points in the manifold where the geodesics starting at $p$ stop being minimizing.

The least distance from p to the cut locus is the injectivity radius at p. On the open ball of this radius, the exponential map at p is a diffeomorphism from the tangent space to the manifold, and this is the largest such radius. The global injectivity radius is defined to be the infimum of the injectivity radius at p, over all points of the manifold.

== Characterization ==
Suppose $q$ is in the cut locus of $p$ in $M$. A standard result is that either (1) there is more than one minimizing geodesic joining $p$ to $q$, or (2) $p$ and $q$ are conjugate along some geodesic which joins them. It is possible for both (1) and (2) to hold.

== Applications ==
The significance of the cut locus is that the distance function from a point $p$ is smooth, except on the cut locus of $p$ and $p$ itself. In particular, it makes sense to take the gradient and Hessian of the distance function away from the cut locus and $p$. This idea is used in the local Laplacian comparison theorem and the local Hessian comparison theorem. These are used in the proof of the local version of the Toponogov theorem, and many other important theorems in Riemannian geometry.

For the metric space of surface distances on a convex polyhedron, cutting the polyhedron along the cut locus produces a shape that can be unfolded flat into a plane, the source unfolding. The unfolding process can be performed continuously, as a blooming of the polyhedron. Analogous methods of cutting along the cut locus can be used to unfold higher-dimensional convex polyhedra as well.

== Cut locus of a subset ==
One can similarly define the cut locus of a submanifold of the Riemannian manifold, in terms of its normal exponential map.
