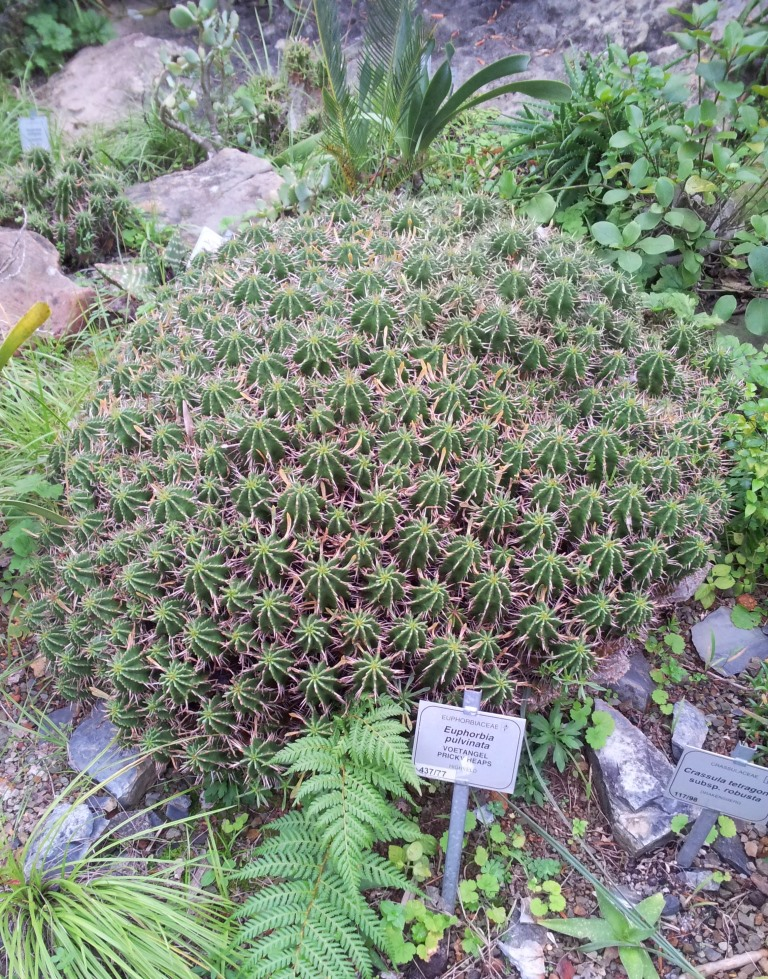
- CITES Appendix II

Scientific classification
- Kingdom: Plantae
- Clade: Tracheophytes
- Clade: Angiosperms
- Clade: Eudicots
- Clade: Rosids
- Order: Malpighiales
- Family: Euphorbiaceae
- Genus: Euphorbia
- Species: E. pulvinata

Binomial name
- Euphorbia pulvinata Marloth

= Euphorbia pulvinata =

Species of succulent plant found in southern Africa

Euphorbia pulvinata, commonly known as the pincushion euphorbia, is a species of flowering plant in the family Euphorbiaceae native to southern Africa.

Like most other succulent members of the genus Euphorbia, its trade is regulated under Appendix II of CITES.

== See also ==
- Pincushion
- Succulent Karoo
