= Biscornu =

Ornamental pincushion

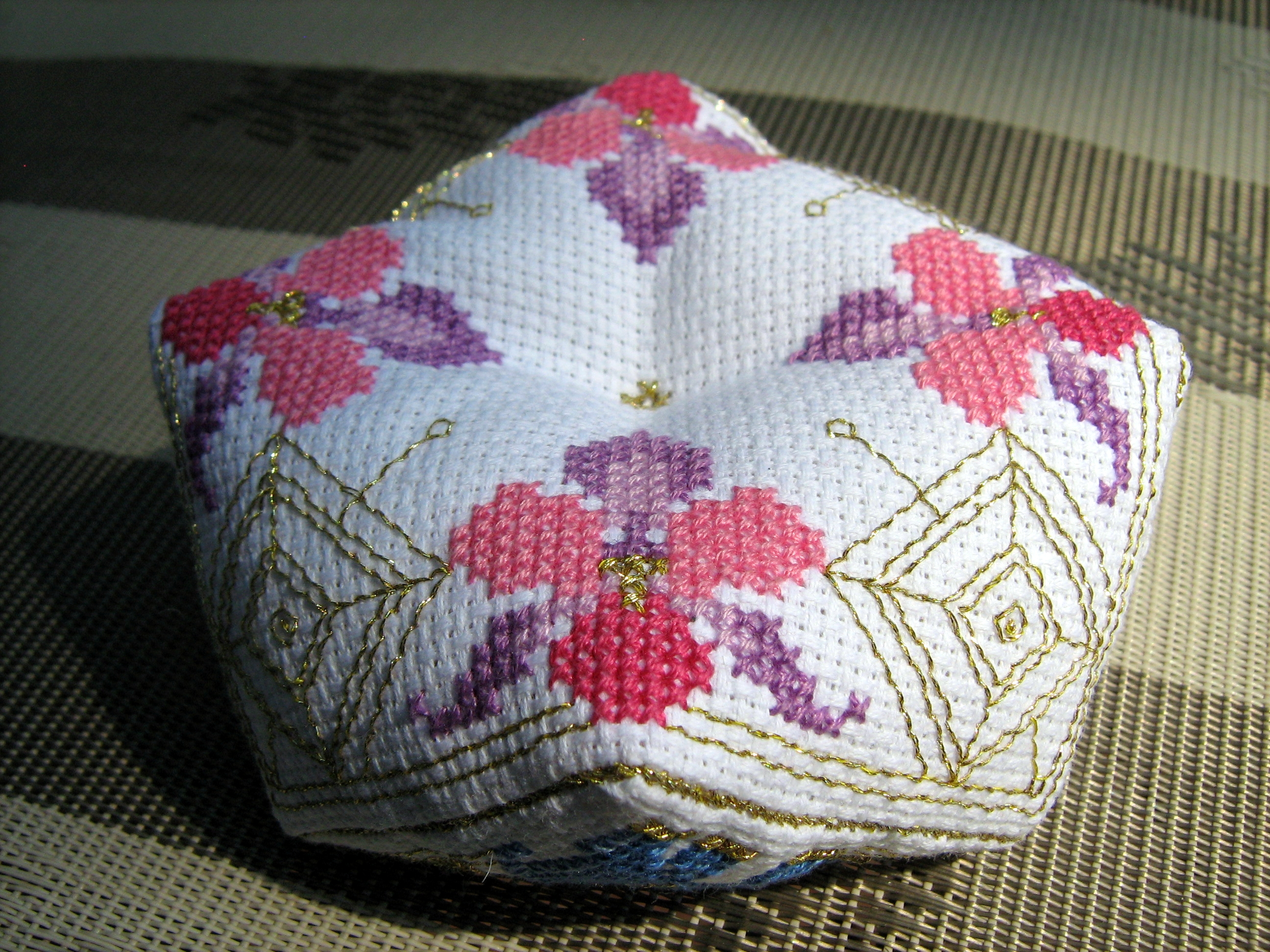
A Thai-themed biscornu, stitched on 14-count white Aida.

A biscornu is a small, octagonal, stuffed ornamental pincushion. It is usually made using evenweave fabric, such as Aida cloth, cotton or linen. The technique involves joining two embroidered squares framed with a backstitch border with a whip stitch in such a way that each corner of one square is attached to the middle of the side of the other. The term comes from the French adjective biscornu, which means irregular, skewed, or odd.

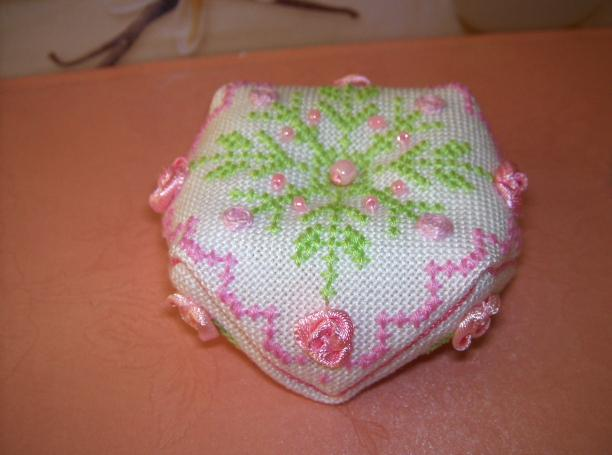
Biscornu with satin ribbons on Lugana

Biscornus are relatively recent and often feature counted thread embroidery like hardanger, cross-stitch and blackwork. A button is commonly placed in the centre of the cushion. Beads, ribbons, tassels and other objects can be used for decoration. A biscornu typically fits in the palm of the hand, although larger 15-sided versions are also made.

Mathematically, two squares joined together in the pattern of a biscornu will form the boundary of a unique convex polyhedron, by Alexandrov's uniqueness theorem. In the case of a biscornu, this polyhedron is a flattened square antiprism, with ten faces: two smaller squares (diagonally inset into the squares from which the shape is formed) and eight isosceles right triangles (the corners of its original squares) around the sides. However, an actual biscornu will have a somewhat more rounded shape than this polyhedron.

== See also ==
- Paper bag problem, on the shape of a pillow formed by hemming two squares together corner-to-corner and edge-to-edge
