= Blooming (geometry) =

Continuous unfolding of a polyhedron

Blooming of platonic solid

In the geometry of convex polyhedra, blooming or continuous blooming is a continuous three-dimensional motion of the surface of the polyhedron, cut to form a polyhedral net, from the polyhedron into a flat and non-self-overlapping placement of the net in a plane. As in rigid origami, the polygons of the net must remain individually flat throughout the motion, and are not allowed to intersect or cross through each other. A blooming, reversed to go from the flat net to a polyhedron, can be thought of intuitively as a way to fold the polyhedron from a paper net without bending the paper except at its designated creases.

An early work on blooming by Biedl, Lubiw, and Sun from 1999 showed that some nets for non-convex but topologically spherical polyhedra have no blooming.

The question of whether every convex polyhedron admits a net with a blooming was posed by Robert Connelly, and came to be known as Connelly’s blooming conjecture. More specifically, Miller and Pak suggested in 2003 that the source unfolding, a net that cuts the polyhedral surface at points with more than one shortest geodesic to a designated source point (including cuts across faces of the polyhedron), always has a blooming. This was proven in 2009 by Demaine et al., who showed in addition that every convex polyhedral net whose polygons are connected in a single path has a blooming, and that every net can be refined to a path-connected net. It is unknown whether every net of a convex polyhedron has a blooming, and Miller and Pak were unwilling to make a conjecture in either direction on this question.

Unsolved problem in mathematics
Does every net of a convex polyhedron have a blooming?
More unsolved problems in mathematics

Because it is unknown whether every convex polyhedron has a net that cuts only edges of the polyhedron, and not across its faces ("Dürer's conjecture"), it is also unknown whether every convex polyhedron has a blooming that cuts only edges. In an unpublished manuscript from 2009, Igor Pak and Rom Pinchasi have claimed that this is indeed possible for every Archimedean solid.

The problem of finding a blooming for a polyhedral net has also been approached computationally, as a problem in motion planning.
