= Common net =

Edge-joined polygon with multiple principle shapes

Common net for both a octahedron and a Tritetrahedron.

In geometry, a common net is a net that can be folded onto several polyhedra. To be a valid common net, there should not exist any non-overlapping sides, and the resulting polyhedra must be connected through faces. Examples of these particular nets in the research date back to the end of the 20th century; despite that, not many examples have been found. Two classes, however, have been deeply explored, regular polyhedra and cuboids. The search for common nets is usually made by either an extensive search or the overlapping of nets that tile the plane.

Demaine et al. (2013) proved that every convex polyhedron can be unfolded and refolded to a different convex polyhedron.

There are types of common nets: strict edge unfoldings and free unfoldings. Strict edge unfoldings refer to common nets where the different polyhedra that can be folded use the same folds: to fold one polyhedra from the net of another, there is no need to make new folds. Free unfoldings refer to the opposite case when we can create as many folds as needed to enable the folding of different polyhedra.

Multiplicity of common nets refers to the number of common nets for the same set of polyhedra.

== Regular polyhedra ==
Open problem 25.31 in Geometric Folding Algorithm by Rourke and Demaine reads:

Can any Platonic solid be cut open and unfolded to a polygon that may be refolded to a different Platonic solid? For example, may a cube be so dissected to a tetrahedron?

This problem has been partially solved by Shirakawa et al. with a fractal net that is conjectured to fold to a tetrahedron and a cube.

Multiplicity	Polyhedra 1	Polyhedra 2	Reference
	Tetrahedron	Cube	
87	tetrahedron	gyroelongated square bipyramid (J_{17})	
37	tetrahedron	snub disphenoid (J_{84})	
	Cube	tetramonohedron	
	Cube	1x1x7 and 1x3x3 cuboids	
	cube	non-regular octahedron	
	octahedron	tetramonohedron	
	octahedron	tetramonohedron	
	octahedron	tritetrahedron	
	icosahedron	tetramonohedron	

== Non-regular polyhedra ==
=== Cuboids ===
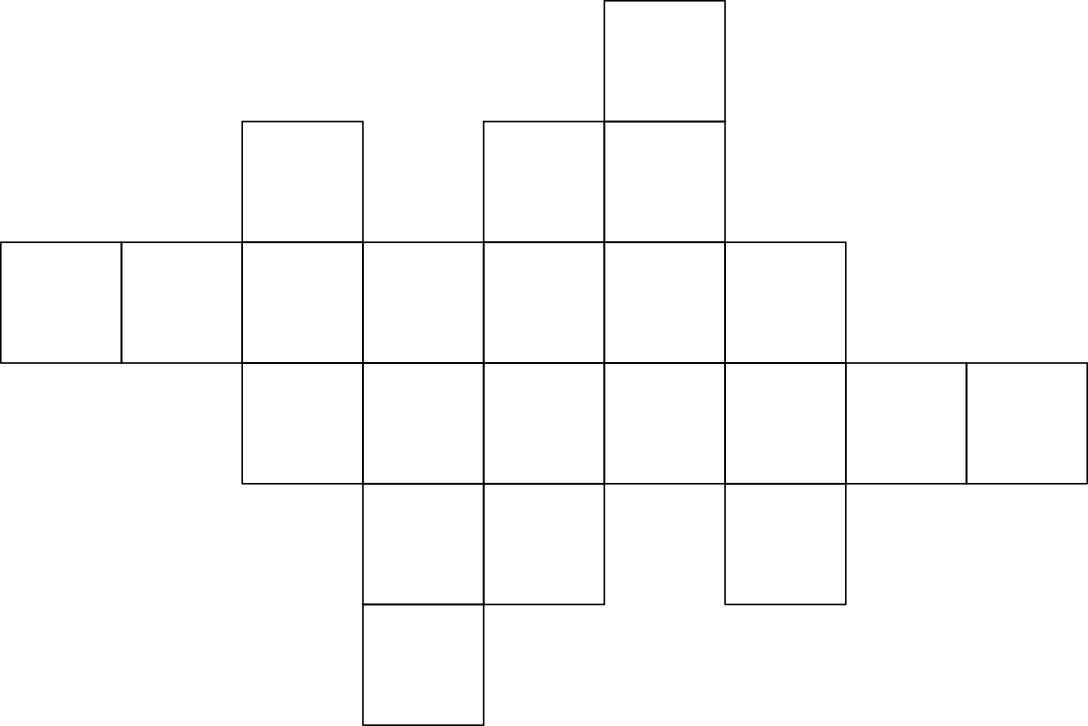
Common net of a 1x1x5 and 1x2x3 cuboid

Common nets of cuboids have been deeply researched, mainly by Uehara and coworkers. To the moment, common nets of up to three cuboids have been found, It has, however, been proven that there exist infinitely many examples of nets that can be folded into more than one polyhedron.

Area	Multiplicity	Cuboid 1	Cuboid 2	Cuboid 3	Reference
22	6495	1x1x5	1x2x3		
22	3	1x1x5	1x2x3	0x1x11	
28		1x2x4	√2x√2x3√2		
30	9	1x1x7	1x3x3	√5x√5x√5	
30	1080	1x1x7	1x3x3		
34	11291	1x1x8	1x2x5		
38	2334	1x1x9	1x3x4		
46	568	1x1x11	1x3x5		
46	92	1x2x7	1x3x5		
54	1735	1x1x13	3x3x3		
54	1806	1x1x13	1x3x6		
54	387	1x3x6	3x3x3		
58	37	1x1x14	1x4x5		
62	5	1x3x7	2x3x5		
64	50	2x2x7	1x2x10		
64	6	2x2x7	2x4x4		
70	3	1x1x17	1x5x5		
70	11	1x2x11	1x3x8		
88	218	2x2x10	1x4x8		
88	86	2x2x10	2x4x6		
160		4x4x8	√10x2√10x2√10		
532		7x8x14	2x4x43	2x13x16	
1792		7x8x56	7x14x38	2x13x58	

*Non-orthogonal foldings

=== Polycubes ===
The first cases of common nets of polycubes found was the work by George Miller, with a later contribution of Donald Knuth, that culminated in the Cubigami puzzle. It’s composed of a net that can fold to all 7 tree-like tetracubes. All possible common nets up to pentacubes were found. All the nets follow strict orthogonal folding despite still being considered free unfoldings.

Area	Multiplicity	Polyhedra	Reference
14	29026	All tricubes	
14		All tricubes	
18	68	All tree-like tetracubes	
22		23 pentacubes	
22	3	22 tree-like pentacubes	
22	1	Non-planar pentacubes	

=== Deltahedra ===
3D Simplicial polytope

Area	Multiplicity	Polyhedra	Reference
8	1	Both 8 face deltahedra	
10	4	7-vertex deltahedra	
