= Ideal polyhedron =

Shape in hyperbolic geometry

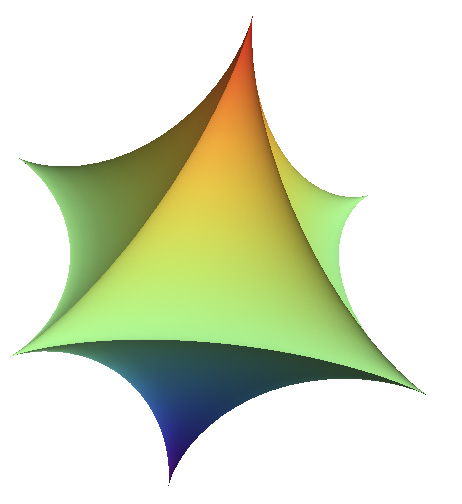
An ideal regular octahedron in the Poincaré ball model of hyperbolic space (sphere at infinity not shown). All dihedral angles of this shape are right angles.

Animation of an ideal icosahedron in the Klein model of hyperbolic space

In three-dimensional hyperbolic geometry, an ideal polyhedron is a convex polyhedron all of whose vertices are ideal points, points "at infinity" rather than interior to three-dimensional hyperbolic space. It can be defined as the convex hull of a finite set of ideal points. An ideal polyhedron has ideal polygons as its faces, meeting along lines of the hyperbolic space.

The Platonic solids and Archimedean solids have ideal versions, with the same combinatorial structure as their more familiar Euclidean versions. Several uniform hyperbolic honeycombs divide hyperbolic space into cells of these shapes, much like the familiar division of Euclidean space into cubes. However, not all polyhedra have ideal versions – a polyhedron can be ideal only when it can be represented in Euclidean space with all its vertices on a circumscribed sphere. Using linear programming, one can test whether a polyhedron has an ideal version, in polynomial time.

Every two ideal polyhedra with the same number of vertices have the same surface area, and one can calculate the volume of an ideal polyhedron using the Lobachevsky function. The surface of an ideal polyhedron forms a hyperbolic manifold, topologically equivalent to a punctured sphere, and every such manifold forms the surface of a unique ideal polyhedron.

== Examples and counterexamples ==
An ideal polyhedron can be constructed as the convex hull of a finite set of ideal points of hyperbolic space, whenever the points do not all lie on a single plane. The resulting shape is the intersection of all closed half-spaces that have the given ideal points as limit points. Alternatively, any Euclidean convex polyhedron that has a circumscribed sphere can be reinterpreted as an ideal polyhedron by interpreting the interior of the sphere as a Klein model for hyperbolic space. In the Klein model, every Euclidean polyhedron enclosed by the sphere represents a hyperbolic polyhedron, and every Euclidean polyhedron with its vertices on the sphere represents an ideal polyhedron.

The triakis tetrahedron, a non-ideal Catalan solid, and the simplest stacked polyhedron that is not an ideal polyhedron

Every isogonal convex polyhedron (one with symmetries taking every vertex to every other vertex) can be represented as an ideal polyhedron, in a way that respects its symmetries, because it has a circumscribed sphere centered at the center of symmetry of the polyhedron. In particular, this implies that the Platonic solids and the Archimedean solids all have ideal forms. However, another highly symmetric class of polyhedra, the Catalan solids, do not all have ideal forms. The Catalan solids are the dual polyhedra to the Archimedean solids, and have symmetries taking any face to any other face. Catalan solids that cannot be ideal include the rhombic dodecahedron and the triakis tetrahedron.

Removing certain triples of vertices from the triakis tetrahedron separates the remaining vertices into multiple connected components. When no such three-vertex separation exists, a polyhedron is said to be 4-connected. Every 4-connected polyhedron has a representation as an ideal polyhedron; for instance this is true of the tetrakis hexahedron, another Catalan solid.

Truncating a single vertex from a cube produces a simple polyhedron (one with three edges per vertex) that cannot be realized as an ideal polyhedron: by Miquel's six circles theorem, if seven of the eight vertices of a cube are ideal, the eighth vertex is also ideal, and so the vertices created by truncating it cannot be ideal. There also exist polyhedra with four edges per vertex that cannot be realized as ideal polyhedra. If a simplicial polyhedron (one with all faces triangles) has all vertex degrees between four and six (inclusive) then it has an ideal representation, but the triakis tetrahedron is simplicial and non-ideal, and the 4-regular non-ideal example above shows that for non-simplicial polyhedra, having all degrees in this range does not guarantee an ideal realization.

A stacked polyhedron is a polyhedron that can be obtained by gluing together tetrahedra, face-to-face. It can be described combinatorially by a dual tree whose vertices are the tetrahedra and whose edges connect the pairs of tetrahedra that are glued together. The resulting polyhedron is ideal if and only if this tree has at most three edges per vertex. For instance, the triakis tetrahedron and Goldner–Harary polyhedron are stacked polyhedra whose dual trees have, respectively, one and two degree-four vertices, with all remaining vertices being leaves of the dual tree. Therefore, these polyhedra are not ideal.

== Properties ==
=== Measurements ===
Every ideal polyhedron with $n$ vertices has a surface that can be subdivided into $2n-4$ ideal triangles, each with area $\pi$. Therefore, the surface area is exactly $(2n-4)\pi$.

In an ideal polyhedron, all face angles and all solid angles at vertices are zero. However, the dihedral angles on the edges of an ideal polyhedron are nonzero. At each vertex, the supplementary angles of the dihedral angles incident to that vertex sum to exactly $2\pi$. This fact can be used to calculate the dihedral angles themselves for a regular or edge-symmetric ideal polyhedron (in which all these angles are equal), by counting how many edges meet at each vertex: an ideal regular tetrahedron, cube or dodecahedron, with three edges per vertex, has dihedral angles $60^\circ=\pi/3=\pi(1-\tfrac{2}{3})$, an ideal regular octahedron or cuboctahedron, with four edges per vertex, has dihedral angles $90^\circ=\pi/2=\pi(1-\tfrac{2}{4})$, and an ideal regular icosahedron, with five edges per vertex, has dihedral angles $108^\circ=3\pi/5=\pi(1-\tfrac{2}{5})$.

The volume of an ideal tetrahedron can be expressed in terms of the Clausen function or Lobachevsky function of its dihedral angles, and the volume of an arbitrary ideal polyhedron can then be found by partitioning it into tetrahedra and summing the volumes of the tetrahedra.

The Dehn invariant of a polyhedron is normally found by combining the edge lengths and dihedral angles of the polyhedron, but in the case of an ideal polyhedron the edge lengths are infinite. This difficulty can be avoided by using a horosphere to truncate each vertex, leaving a finite length along each edge. The resulting shape is not itself a polyhedron because the truncated faces are not flat, but it has finite edge lengths, and its Dehn invariant can be calculated in the normal way, ignoring the new edges where the truncated faces meet the original faces of the polyhedron. Because of the way the Dehn invariant is defined, and the constraints on the dihedral angles meeting at a single vertex of an ideal polyhedron, the result of this calculation does not depend on the choice of horospheres used to truncate the vertices.

=== Combinatorial structure ===
As Ernst Steinitz (1928) proved, the maximum independent set of any ideal polyhedron (the largest possible subset of non-adjacent vertices) must have at most half of the vertices of the polyhedron. It can have exactly half only when the vertices can be partitioned into two equal-size independent sets, so that the graph of the polyhedron is a balanced bipartite graph, as it is for an ideal cube. More strongly, the graph of any ideal polyhedron is 1-tough, meaning that, for any $k$, removing $k$ vertices from the graph leaves at most $k$ connected components. For example, the rhombic dodecahedron is bipartite, but has an independent set with more than half of its vertices, and the triakis tetrahedron has an independent set of exactly half the vertices but is not bipartite, so neither can be realized as an ideal polyhedron.

== Characterization and recognition ==
Not all convex polyhedra are combinatorially equivalent to ideal polyhedra. The geometric characterization of inscribed polyhedra was attempted, unsuccessfully, by René Descartes in his c.1630 manuscript De solidorum elementis. The question of finding a combinatorial characterization of the ideal polyhedra, analogous to Steinitz's theorem characterizing the Euclidean convex polyhedra, was raised by Jakob Steiner (1832); a numerical (rather than combinatorial) characterization was provided by Hodgson, Rivin & Smith (1992). Their characterization is based on the fact that the dihedral angles of an ideal polyhedron, incident to a single ideal vertex, must have supplementary angles that sum to exactly $2\pi$, while the supplementary angles crossed by any Jordan curve on the surface of the polyhedron that has more than one vertex on both of its sides must be larger. For instance, for the ideal cube, the dihedral angles are $\pi/3$ and their supplements are $2\pi/3$. The three supplementary angles at a single vertex sum to $2\pi$ but the four angles crossed by a curve midway between two opposite faces sum to $8\pi/3 > 2\pi$, and other curves cross even more of these angles with even larger sums. Hodgson, Rivin & Smith (1992) show that a convex polyhedron is equivalent to an ideal polyhedron if and only if it is possible to assign numbers to its edges with the same properties: these numbers all lie between $0$ and $\pi$, they add up to $2\pi$ at each vertex, and they add up to more than $2\pi$ on each non-facial cycle of the dual graph. When such an assignment exists, there is a unique ideal polyhedron whose dihedral angles are supplementary to these numbers. As a consequence of this characterization, realizability as an ideal polyhedron can be expressed as a linear program with exponentially many constraints (one for each non-facial cycle), and tested in polynomial time using the ellipsoid algorithm.

A more combinatorial characterization was provided by Dillencourt & Smith (1995) for the special case of simple polyhedra, polyhedra with only three faces and three edges meeting at each (ideal) vertex. According to their characterization, a simple polyhedron is ideal or inscribable if and only if one of two conditions is met: either the graph of the polyhedron is a bipartite graph and its dual graph is 4-connected, or it is a 1-supertough graph. In this condition, being 1-supertough is a variation of graph toughness; it means that, for every set $S$ of more than one vertex of the graph, the removal of $S$ from the graph leaves a number of connected components that is strictly smaller than $|S|$. Based on this characterization they found a linear time combinatorial algorithm for testing realizability of simple polyhedra as ideal polyhedra.

== Honeycombs ==
Honeycombs of ideal regular polyhedra

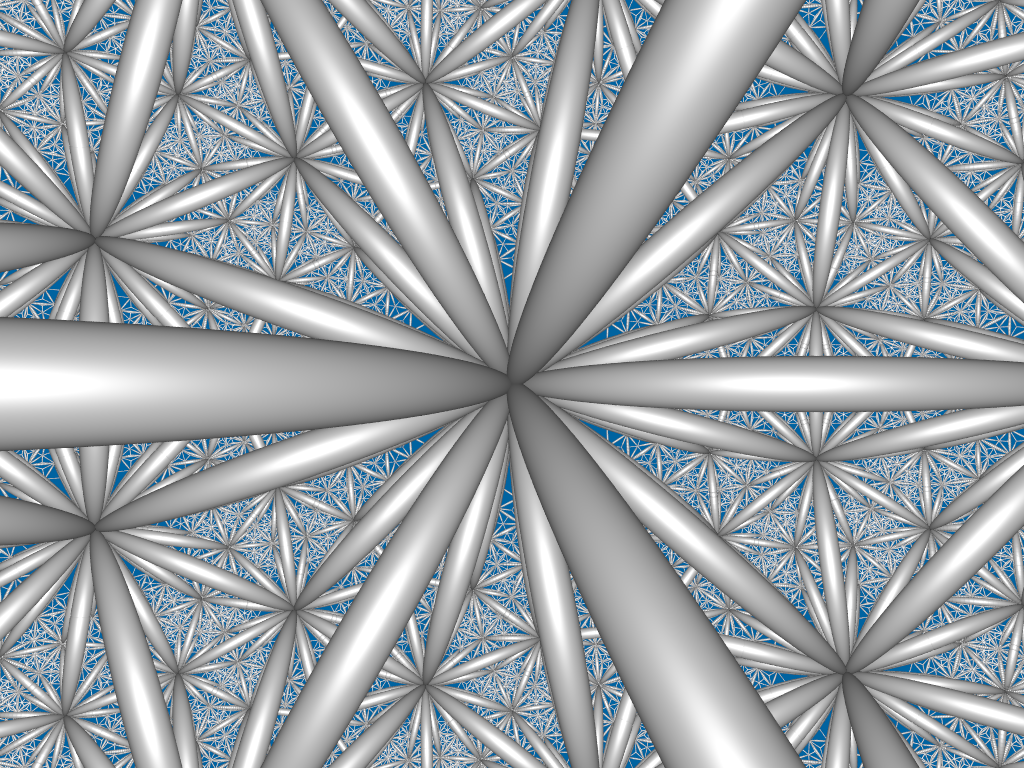
order-6 tetrahedral

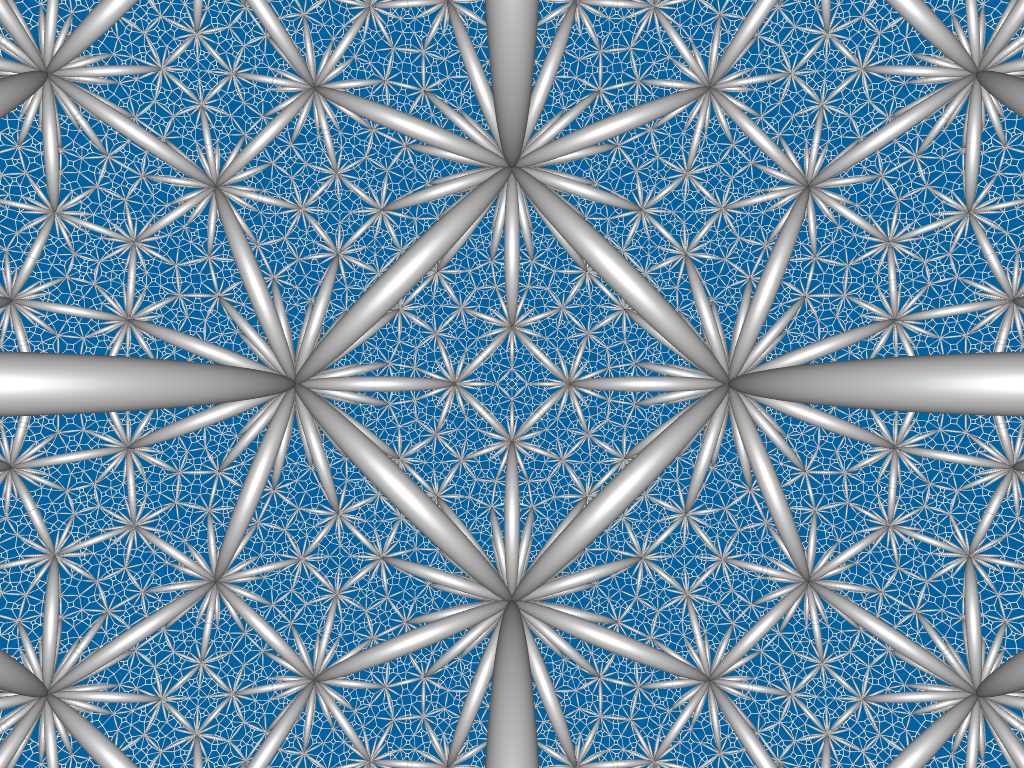
order-6 cubic

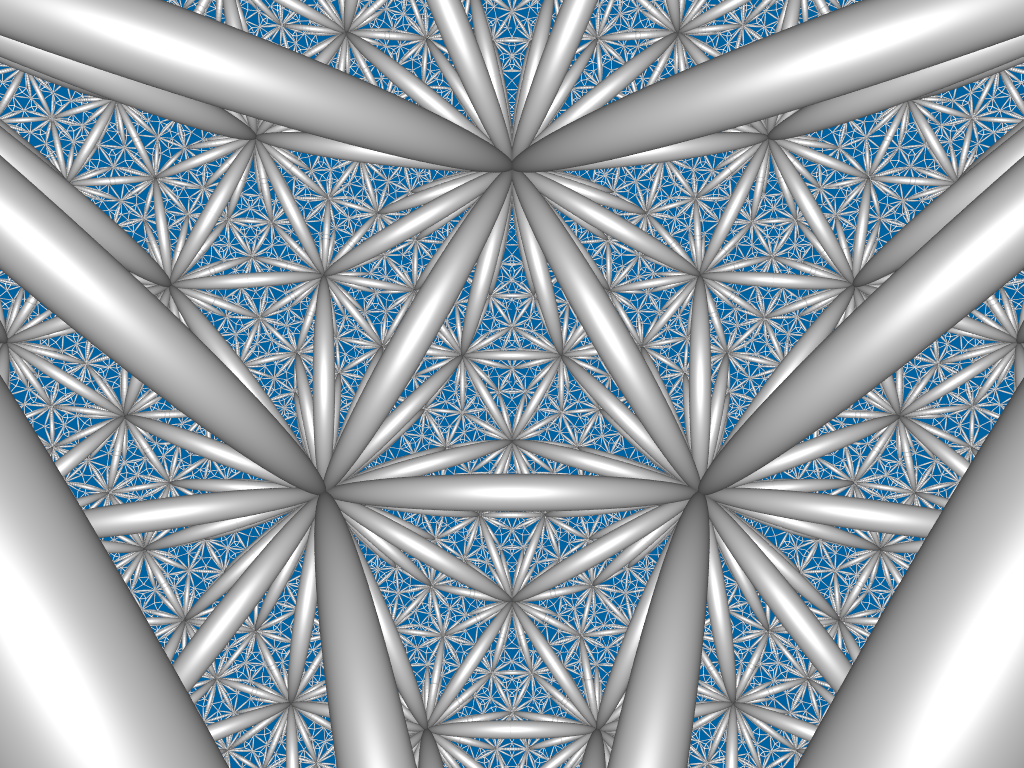
order-4 octahedral

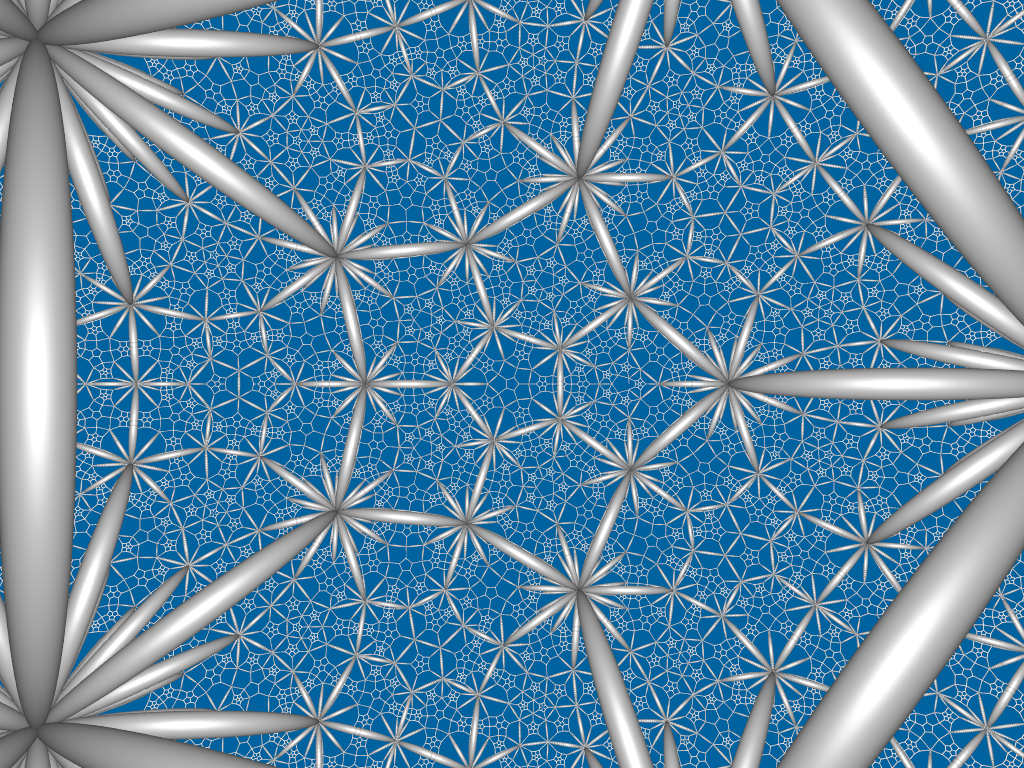
order-6 dodecahedral

Because the ideal regular tetrahedron, cube, octahedron, and dodecahedron all have dihedral angles that are integer fractions of $2\pi$, they can all tile hyperbolic space, forming a regular honeycomb. In this they differ from the Euclidean regular solids, among which only the cube can tile space. The ideal tetrahedron, cube, octahedron, and dodecahedron form respectively the order-6 tetrahedral honeycomb, order-6 cubic honeycomb, order-4 octahedral honeycomb, and order-6 dodecahedral honeycomb; here the order refers to the number of cells meeting at each edge. However, the ideal icosahedron does not tile space in the same way.

The Epstein–Penner decomposition, a construction of D. B. A. Epstein and R. C. Penner (1988), can be used to decompose any cusped hyperbolic 3-manifold into ideal polyhedra, and to represent the manifold as the result of gluing together these ideal polyhedra. Each manifold that can be represented in this way has a finite number of representations. The universal cover of the manifold inherits the same decomposition, which forms a honeycomb of ideal polyhedra. Examples of cusped manifolds, leading to honeycombs in this way, arise naturally as the knot complements of hyperbolic links, which have a cusp for each component of the link. For example, the complement of the figure-eight knot is associated in this way with the order-6 tetrahedral honeycomb, and the complement of the Borromean rings is associated in the same way with the order-4 octahedral honeycomb. These two honeycombs, and three others using the ideal cuboctahedron, triangular prism, and truncated tetrahedron, arise in the study of the Bianchi groups, and come from cusped manifolds formed as quotients of hyperbolic space by subgroups of Bianchi groups. The same manifolds can also be interpreted as link complements.

== Surface manifold ==
The surface of an ideal polyhedron (not including its vertices) forms a manifold, topologically equivalent to a punctured sphere, with a uniform two-dimensional hyperbolic geometry; the folds of the surface in its embedding into hyperbolic space are not detectable as folds in the intrinsic geometry of the surface. Because this surface can be partitioned into ideal triangles, its total area is finite. Conversely, and analogously to Alexandrov's uniqueness theorem, every two-dimensional manifold with uniform hyperbolic geometry and finite area, combinatorially equivalent to a finitely-punctured sphere, can be realized as the surface of an ideal polyhedron. (As with Alexandrov's theorem, such surfaces must be allowed to include ideal dihedra.) From this point of view, the theory of ideal polyhedra has close connections with discrete approximations to conformal maps.

Surfaces of ideal polyhedra may also be considered more abstractly as topological spaces formed by gluing together ideal triangles by isometry along their edges. For every such surface, and every closed curve which does not merely wrap around a single vertex of the polyhedron (one or more times) without separating any others, there is a unique geodesic on the surface that is homotopic to the given curve. In this respect, ideal polyhedra are different from Euclidean polyhedra (and from their Euclidean Klein models): for instance, on a Euclidean cube, any geodesic can cross at most two edges incident to a single vertex consecutively, before crossing a non-incident edge, but geodesics on the ideal cube are not limited in this way.

== See also ==
- Canonical polyhedron, a polyhedron in which each edge is tangent to a common sphere
- Angle of parallelism
