= Save the Garment Center =

Organization in New York City, US

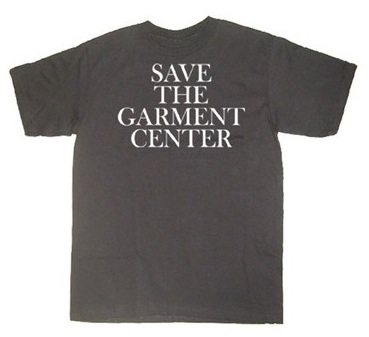
- Founded: 2008 in New York City
- Type: Non-profit, Interest group
- Fields: Preserving fading Garment District
- Website: http://www.savethegarmentcenter.org

Save the Garment Center is a campaign spearheaded by designers Nanette Lepore and Anna Sui as well as many local designers, organizations and fashion manufacturers to preserve New York City's fading Garment District. The loss of jobs and culture as a result of non-conducive zoning laws has led many in the industry to join together on a campaign to save what is left of the once-vibrant garment center. Fashion Week in September 2008 was filled with T-shirts that embodied the cause and provided contact information of city officials. Women's Wear Daily highlighted the issue during this week, and many designers and members of the Council of Fashion Designers of America lauded the effort.
