= Enneadecahedron =

Polyhedron with 19 faces

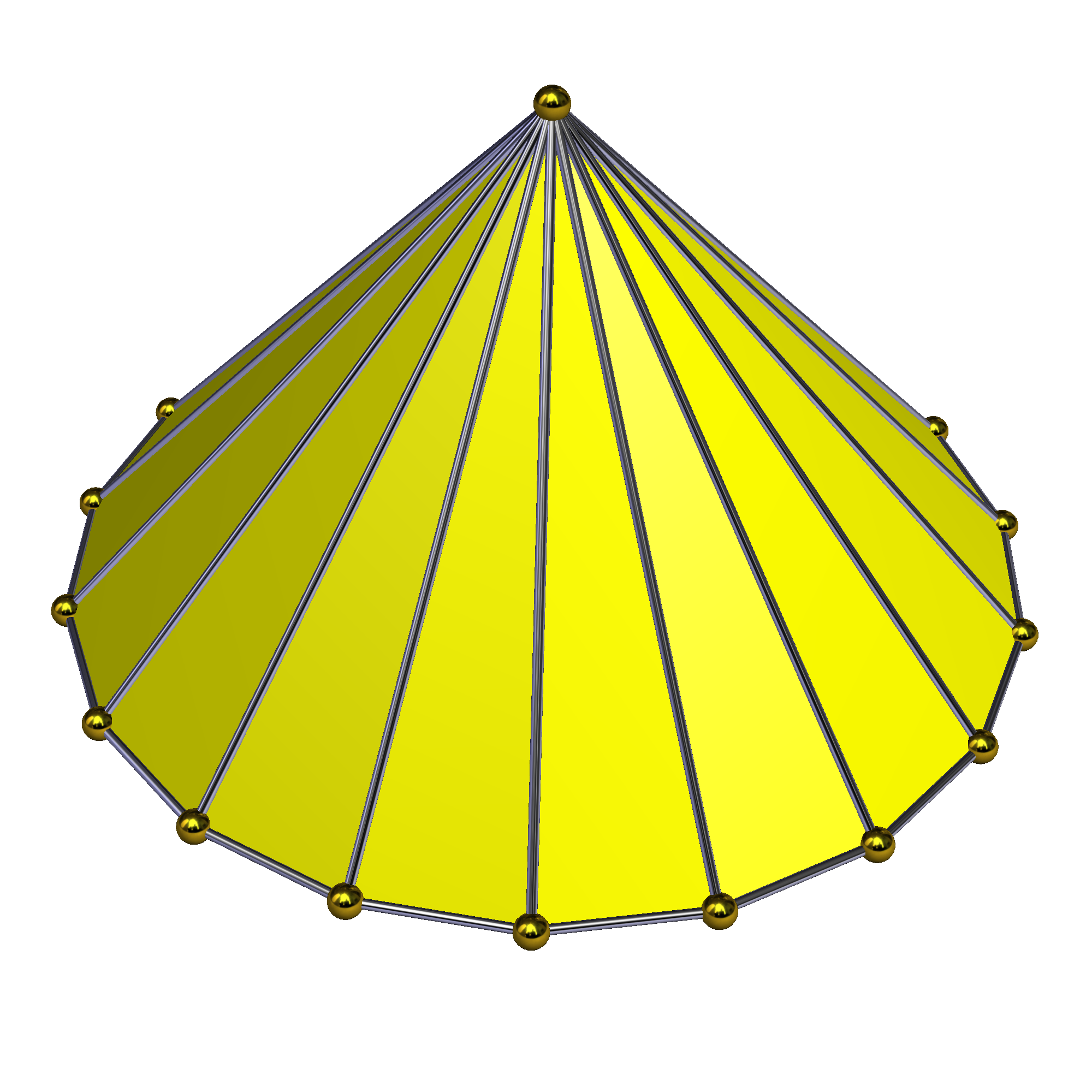
Octadecagonal (18-sided) pyramid

3D model of 18-sided pyramid

a 19-sided 3d object composed of 1 hexagonal face, 12 rectangular faces, 6 triangular faces

Heptadecagonal (17-sided) prism

A enneadecahedron (or enneakaidecahedron) is a polyhedron with 19 faces. No enneadecahedron is regular; hence, the name is ambiguous.

There are numerous topologically distinct forms of an enneadecahedron, for example the octadecagonal (18-sided) pyramid, or the heptadecagonal (17-sided) prism; the latter is the only convex enneadecahedron with all regular polygonal faces.

== Convex enneadecahedra ==
There are many topologically distinct convex enneadecahedra, excluding mirror images, having at least 12 vertices. (Two polyhedra are "topologically distinct" if they have intrinsically different arrangements of faces and vertices, such that it is possible to distort one into the other simply by changing the lengths of edges or the angles between edges or faces.)
