= Paper bag problem =

On volume enclosed by two rectangles

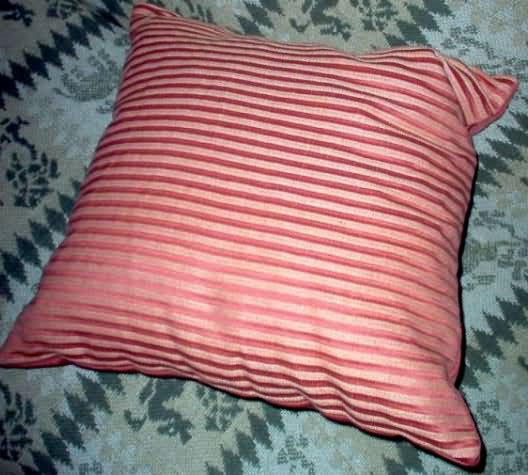
A cushion filled with stuffing

In geometry, the paper bag problem or teabag problem is to calculate the maximum possible inflated volume of an initially flat sealed rectangular bag which has the same shape as a cushion or pillow, made out of two pieces of material which can bend but not stretch.

According to Anthony C. Robin, an approximate formula for the capacity of a sealed expanded bag is:

$$V=w^3 \left (h/ \left (\pi  w \right ) -0.142  \left (1-10^ \left (-h/w \right ) \right ) \right ),$$

where w is the width of the bag (the shorter dimension), h is the height (the longer dimension), and V is the maximum volume. The approximation ignores the crimping round the equator of the bag.

A very rough approximation to the capacity of a bag that is open at one edge is:

$$V=w^3  \left (h/ \left (\pi  w \right ) -0.071 \left (1-10^ \left (-2h/w \right ) \right ) \right )$$

(This latter formula assumes that the corners at the bottom of the bag are linked by a single edge, and that the base of the bag is not a more complex shape such as a lens).

== The square teabag ==
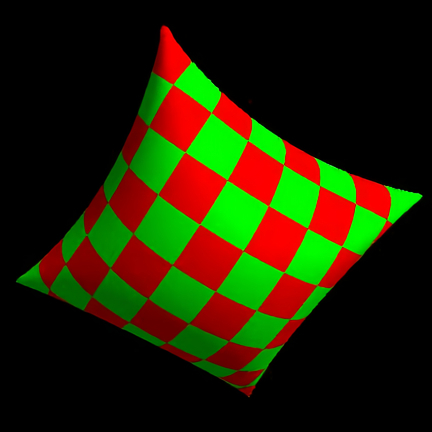
A numerical simulation of an inflated teabag (with crimping smoothed out)

For the special case where the bag is sealed on all edges and is square with unit sides, h = w = 1, the first formula estimates a volume of roughly

$$V=\frac 1 {\pi} - 0.142 \cdot 0.9$$

or roughly 0.19. According to Andrew Kepert, a lecturer in mathematics at the University of Newcastle, Australia, an upper bound for this version of the teabag problem is 0.217+, and he has made a construction that appears to give a volume of 0.2055+.

Robin also found a more complicated formula for the general paper bag, which gives 0.2017, below the bounds given by Kepert (i.e., 0.2055+ ≤ maximum volume ≤ 0.217+).

== See also ==
- Biscornu, a shape formed by attaching two squares in a different way, with the corner of one at the midpoint of the other
- Mylar balloon (geometry)
