= Alexandrov's theorem on polyhedra =

Polyhedra are determined by surface distance

Alexandrov's theorem on polyhedra is a rigidity theorem in mathematics, describing three-dimensional convex polyhedra in terms of the distances between points on their surfaces. It implies that convex polyhedra with distinct shapes from each other also have distinct metric spaces of surface distances, and it characterizes the metric spaces that come from the surface distances on polyhedra. It is named after Soviet mathematician Aleksandr Danilovich Aleksandrov, who published it in the 1940s.

== Statement of the theorem ==
The surface of any convex polyhedron in Euclidean space forms a metric space, in which the distance between two points is measured by the length of the shortest path from one point to the other along the surface. Within a single shortest path, distances between pairs of points equal the distances between corresponding points of a line segment of the same length; a path with this property is known as a geodesic. This property of polyhedral surfaces, that every pair of points is connected by a geodesic, is not true of many other metric spaces, and when it is true the space is called a geodesic space. The geodesic space formed from the surface of a polyhedron is called its development.

Four regular hexagons can be folded and glued to form the surface of a regular octahedron. In this example the edges of the hexagons do not fall along edges of the octahedron. The same gluing pattern can also produce a non-convex polyhedron with 24 triangular faces.

The polyhedron can be thought of as being folded from a sheet of paper (a net for the polyhedron) and it inherits the same geometry as the paper: for every point p within a face of the polyhedron, a sufficiently small open neighborhood of p will have the same distances as a subset of the Euclidean plane. The same thing is true even for points on the edges of the polyhedron: they can be modeled locally as a Euclidean plane folded along a line and embedded into three-dimensional space, but the fold does not change the structure of shortest paths along the surface. However, the vertices of the polyhedron have a different distance structure: the local geometry of a polyhedron vertex is the same as the local geometry at the apex of a cone. Any cone can be formed from a flat sheet of paper with a wedge removed from it by gluing together the cut edges where the wedge was removed. The angle of the wedge that was removed is called the angular defect of the vertex; it is a positive number less than 2π. The defect of a polyhedron vertex can be measured by subtracting the face angles at that vertex from 2π. For instance, in a regular tetrahedron, each face angle is π/3, and there are three of them at each vertex, so subtracting them from 2π leaves a defect of π at each of the four vertices. Similarly, a cube has a defect of π/2 at each of its eight vertices. Descartes's theorem on total angular defect (a form of the Gauss–Bonnet theorem) states that the sum of the angular defects of all the vertices is always exactly 4π. In summary, the development of a convex polyhedron is geodesic, homeomorphic (topologically equivalent) to a sphere, and locally Euclidean except for a finite number of cone points whose angular defect sums to 4π.

Alexandrov's theorem gives a converse to this description. It states that if a metric space is geodesic, homeomorphic to a sphere, and locally Euclidean except for a finite number of cone points of positive angular defect (necessarily summing to 4π), then there exists a convex polyhedron whose development is the given space. Moreover, this polyhedron is uniquely defined from the metric: any two convex polyhedra with the same surface metric must be congruent to each other as three-dimensional sets.

== Limitations ==
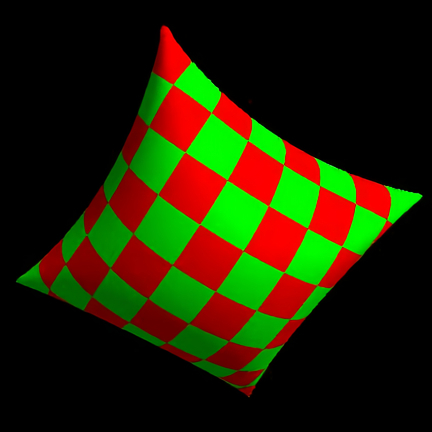
Two square sheets joined along their edges form a degenerate flat polyhedron, with four points of angular deficiency π at its four corners. It can be inflated without stretching into this non-convex shape, making the conical nature of the corners more apparent.

The polyhedron representing the given metric space may be degenerate: it may form a doubly-covered two-dimensional convex polygon (a dihedron) rather than a fully three-dimensional polyhedron. In this case, its surface metric consists of two copies of the polygon (its two sides) glued together along corresponding edges.

A regular icosahedron has the same surface metric as a non-convex deltahedron in which one five-triangle pyramid is pushed in

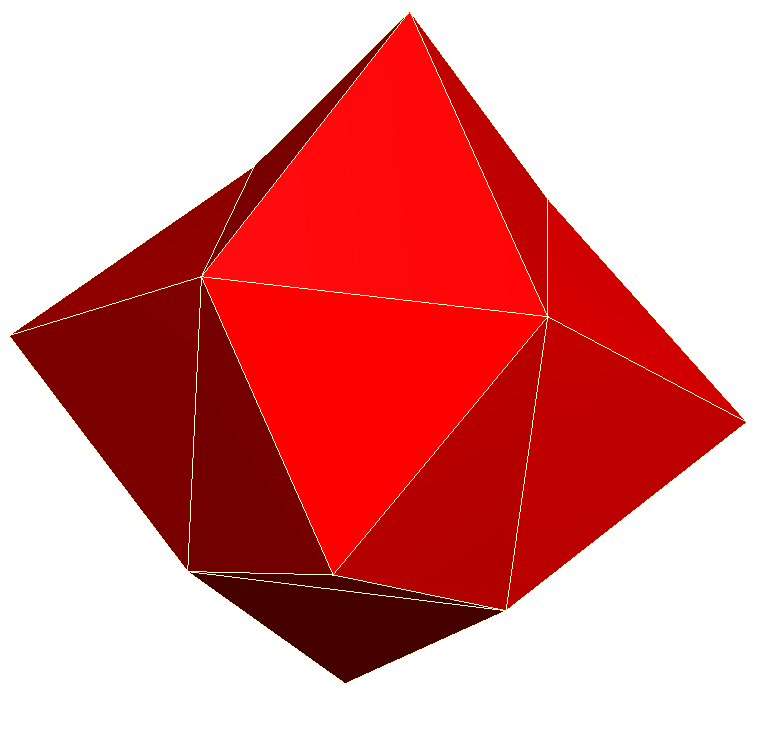
Non-convex 24-sided tetrakis hexahedron with the same surface geometry as a regular octahedron

Although Alexandrov's theorem states that there is a unique convex polyhedron whose surface has a given metric, it may also be possible for there to exist non-convex polyhedra with the same metric. An example is given by the regular icosahedron: if five of its triangles are removed, and are replaced by five congruent triangles forming an indentation into the polyhedron, the resulting surface metric stays unchanged. This example uses the same creases for the convex and non-convex polyhedron, but that is not always the case. For instance, the surface of a regular octahedron can be re-folded along different creases into a non-convex polyhedron with 24 equilateral triangle faces, the Kleetope obtained by gluing square pyramids onto the squares of a cube. Six triangles meet at each additional vertex introduced by this refolding, so they have zero angular defect and remain locally Euclidean. In the illustration of an octahedron folded from four hexagons, these 24 triangles are obtained by subdividing each hexagon into six triangles.

The development of any polyhedron can be described concretely by a collection of two-dimensional polygons together with instructions for gluing them together along their edges to form a metric space, and the conditions of Alexandrov's theorem for spaces described in this way are easily checked. However, the edges where two polygons are glued together could become flat and lie in the interior of faces of the resulting polyhedron, rather than becoming polyhedron edges. (For an example of this phenomenon, see the illustration of four hexagons glued to form an octahedron.) Therefore, even when the development is described in this way, it may not be clear what shape the resulting polyhedron has, what shapes its faces have, or even how many faces it has. Alexandrov's original proof does not lead to an algorithm for constructing the polyhedron (for instance by giving coordinates for its vertices) realizing the given metric space. In 2008, Bobenko and Izmestiev provided such an algorithm. Their algorithm can approximate the coordinates arbitrarily accurately, in pseudo-polynomial time.

== Related results ==
One of the earliest existence and uniqueness theorems for convex polyhedra is Cauchy's theorem, which states that a convex polyhedron is uniquely determined by the shape and connectivity of its faces. Alexandrov's theorem strengthens this by showing that even if the faces are allowed to bend or fold, without stretching or shrinking, then their connectivity still determines the shape of the polyhedron. In turn, Alexandrov's proof of the existence part of his theorem uses a strengthening of Cauchy's theorem by Max Dehn to infinitesimal rigidity.

An analogous result to Alexandrov's holds for smooth convex surfaces: a two-dimensional Riemannian manifold whose Gaussian curvature is everywhere positive and totals 4π can be represented uniquely as the surface of a smooth convex body in three dimensions. The uniqueness of this representation is a result of Stephan Cohn-Vossen from 1927, with some regularity conditions on the surface that were removed in subsequent research. Its existence was proven by Alexandrov, using an argument involving limits of polyhedral metrics. Aleksei Pogorelov generalized both these results, characterizing the developments of arbitrary convex bodies in three dimensions.

Another result of Pogorelov on the geodesic metric spaces derived from convex polyhedra is a version of the theorem of the three geodesics: every convex polyhedron has at least three simple closed quasigeodesics. These are curves that are locally straight lines except when they pass through a vertex, where they are required to have angles of less than π on both sides of them.

The developments of ideal hyperbolic polyhedra can be characterized in a similar way to Euclidean convex polyhedra: every two-dimensional manifold with uniform hyperbolic geometry and finite area, combinatorially equivalent to a finitely-punctured sphere, can be realized as the surface of an ideal polyhedron.
