= Angular defect =

In geometry, the angular defect or simply defect (also called deficit or deficiency) is the failure of some angles to add up to the expected amount of 360° or 180°, when such angles in the Euclidean plane would. The opposite notion is the excess.

Classically, the defect arises in two contexts: in the Euclidean plane, angles about a point add up to 360°, while interior angles in a triangle add up to 180°. However, on a convex polyhedron, the angles of the faces meeting at a vertex add up to less than 360° (a defect), while the angles at some vertices of a nonconvex polyhedron may add up to more than 360° (an excess). In addition, the angles in a hyperbolic triangle add up to less than 180° (a defect), while those on a spherical triangle add up to more than 180° (an excess).

In modern terms, the defect at a vertex is a discrete version of the curvature of the polyhedral surface concentrated at that point. Negative defect indicates that the vertex resembles a saddle point (negative curvature), whereas positive defect indicates that the vertex resembles a local maximum or minimum (positive curvature). The Gauss–Bonnet theorem gives the total curvature as $2\pi$ times the Euler characteristic $\chi = 2$, so for a convex polyhedron the sum of the defects is $4\pi$, while a toroidal polyhedron has $\chi = 0$ and total defect zero.

== Defect of a vertex ==
For a polyhedron, the defect at a vertex equals 2π minus the sum of all the angles at the vertex (all the faces at the vertex are included). If a polyhedron is convex, then the defect of each vertex is always positive. If the sum of the angles exceeds a full turn, as occurs in some vertices of many non-convex polyhedra, then the defect is negative.

The concept of defect extends to higher dimensions as the amount by which the sum of the dihedral angles of the cells at a peak falls short of a full circle.

== Examples ==
The defect of any of the vertices of a regular dodecahedron (in which three regular pentagons meet at each vertex) is 36°, or π/5 radians, or 1/10 of a circle. Each of the angles measures 108°; three of these meet at each vertex, so the defect is 360° − (108° + 108° + 108°) = 36°.

The same procedure can be followed for the other Platonic solids:

| Shape | Number of vertices | Polygons meeting at each vertex | Defect at each vertex | Total defect |
|---|---|---|---|---|
| tetrahedron | 4 | Three equilateral triangles | $\pi \ \ (180^\circ )$ | $4\pi \ \ (720^\circ )$ |
| octahedron | 6 | Four equilateral triangles | ${2 \pi\over 3} \ (120^\circ )$ | $4\pi \ \ (720^\circ )$ |
| cube | 8 | Three squares | ${\pi\over 2}\ \ (90^\circ )$ | $4\pi \ \ (720^\circ )$ |
| icosahedron | 12 | Five equilateral triangles | ${\pi\over 3}\ \ (60^\circ )$ | $4\pi \ \ (720^\circ )$ |
| dodecahedron | 20 | Three regular pentagons | ${\pi\over 5}\ \ (36^\circ )$ | $4\pi \ \ (720^\circ )$ |

== Descartes's theorem on total angular defect ==
Descartes's theorem on the "total defect" of a polyhedron states that if the polyhedron is homeomorphic to a sphere (i.e. topologically equivalent to a sphere, so that it may be deformed into a sphere by stretching without tearing), the "total defect", i.e. the sum of the defects of all of the vertices, is two full circles (or 720° or 4π radians). The polyhedron need not be convex.

A generalization says the number of circles in the total defect equals the Euler characteristic of the polyhedron. This is a special case of the Gauss–Bonnet theorem, which relates the integral of the Gaussian curvature to the Euler characteristic. Here, the Gaussian curvature is concentrated at the vertices: on the faces and edges the curvature is zero (the surface is locally isometric to a Euclidean plane) and the integral of curvature at a vertex is equal to the defect there (by definition).

This can be used to calculate the number V of vertices of a polyhedron by totaling the angles of all the faces, and adding the total defect (which is $2\pi$ times the Euler characteristic). This total will have one complete circle for every vertex in the polyhedron.

A converse to Descartes's theorem is given by Alexandrov's theorem on polyhedra, according to which a metric space that is locally Euclidean (hence zero curvature) except for a finite number of points of positive angular defect, adding to $4\pi$, can be realized uniquely as the surface of a convex polyhedron.

== Positive defects on non-convex figures ==
Two polyhedra with positive defects

It is tempting to think that every non-convex polyhedron must have some vertices whose defect is negative, but this need not be the case if the Euler characteristic is positive (a topological sphere).

A counterexample is provided by a cube where one face is replaced by a square pyramid: this elongated square pyramid is convex and the defects at each vertex are each positive. Now consider the same cube where the square pyramid goes into the cube: this is concave, but the defects remain the same, and so are all positive.

Two counterexamples that are self-intersecting polyhedra are the small stellated dodecahedron and the great stellated dodecahedron, with twelve and twenty convex points respectively, all with positive defects.
