= Garment District, Manhattan =

Neighborhood in New York City

- Garment Center Historic District
- U.S. National Register of Historic Places
- U.S. Historic district
- New York State Register of Historic Places
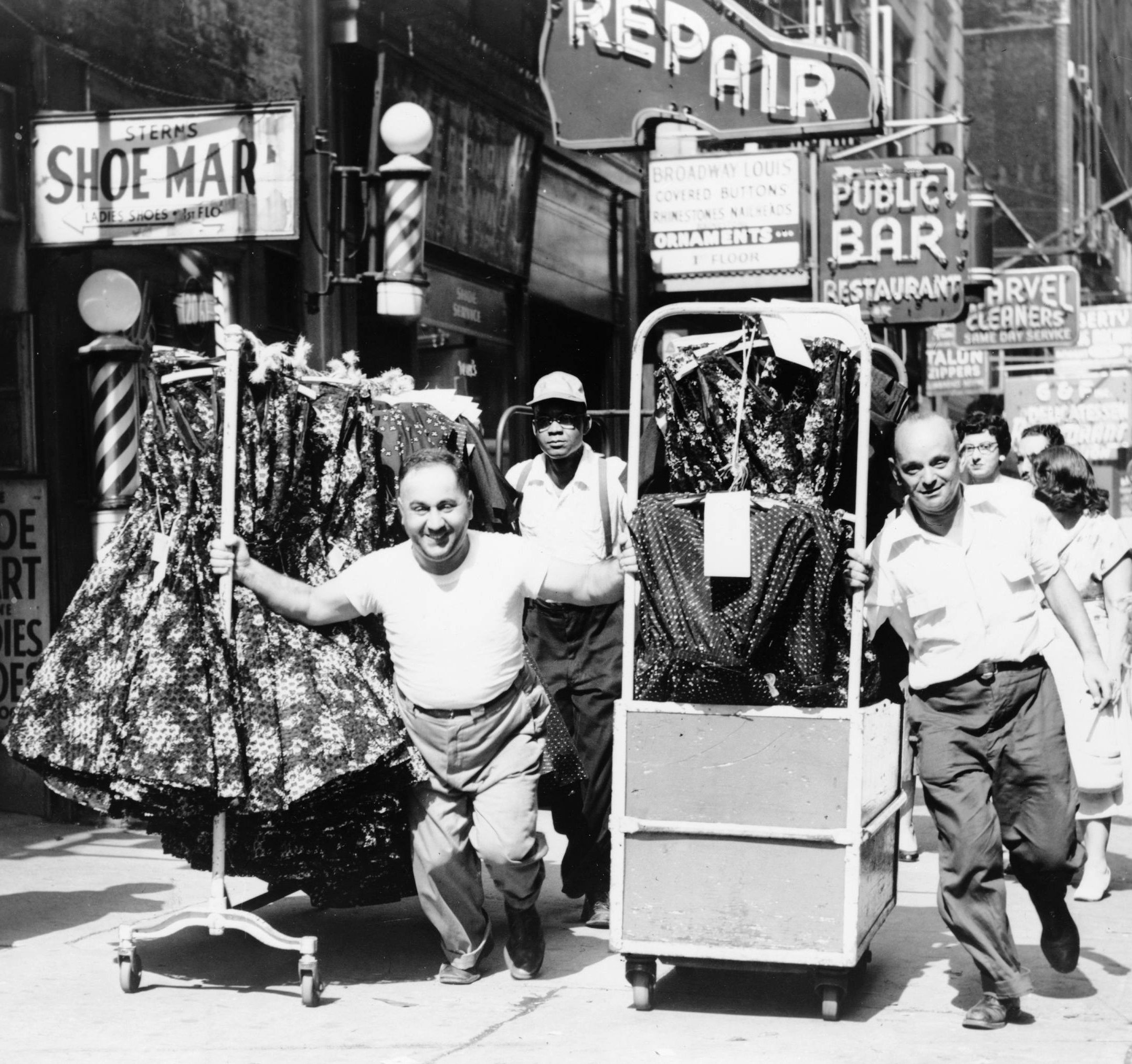
- Men pulling racks of clothing on a busy sidewalk in the Garment District in 1955

- Location within Manhattan Location within New York City Location within New York Location within the United States
- Location: Roughly bounded by Sixth Ave., Ninth Ave., W. 35th St., and W. 41st St. (NRHP district), Manhattan, New York, US
- Coordinates: 40.7535°N 73.9888°W
- Area: 74 acres (30 ha)
- Built: 1916
- Architects: Blum and Blum; et al.
- Architectural style: Moderne, Art Deco, Beaux-Arts
- NRHP reference No.: 08001034

Significant dates
- Added to NRHP: November 5, 2008
- Designated NYSRHP: September 18, 2008

The Garment District, also known as the Garment Center, the Fashion District, or the Fashion Center, is a neighborhood located in the borough of Manhattan in New York City. Historically known for its role in the production and manufacturing of clothing, the neighborhood derives its name from its dense concentration of fashion-related uses. The neighborhood, less than 1 square mile (2.6 km^{2}; 640 acres), is generally considered to lie between Fifth Avenue and Ninth Avenue, from 34th to 42nd Streets.

The neighborhood is home to many of New York City's showrooms and to numerous major fashion labels, and caters to all aspects of the fashion process from design and production to wholesale selling. The Garment District has been known since the early 20th century as the center for fashion manufacturing and fashion design in the United States. A study demonstrated that general proximity to New York's Garment District was important to participate in the American fashion ecosystem.

== Geography ==
By the late 1930s, the Garment District was broadly surrounded by Sixth Avenue to the east, 25th Street to the south, Ninth Avenue to the west, and 42nd Street to the north. The southern portion, between 25th and 30th Streets, comprised the Fur District, which conducted a very similar function.

The modern-day Garment District's boundaries may be defined most broadly as the area of Manhattan west of Fifth Avenue, below 42nd Street, and as far south as the mid- or upper-20s (including the Fashion Institute of Technology between 26th and 28th Streets from Seventh to Eighth Avenues). The Midtown apparel industry was traditionally concentrated between 28th Street and 38th Street, historically centered around Seventh Avenue (designated "Fashion Avenue" in 1972 for the portion between 26th St. and 42nd St.). With the decline of the industry, the district began to shrink and be concentrated most heavily in the area between Fifth and Ninth Avenues and 35th and 41st Streets, as of 2004. In areas historically part of the Garment District, real estate developers have marketed their projects as being located in Chelsea.

== Role in fashion ==
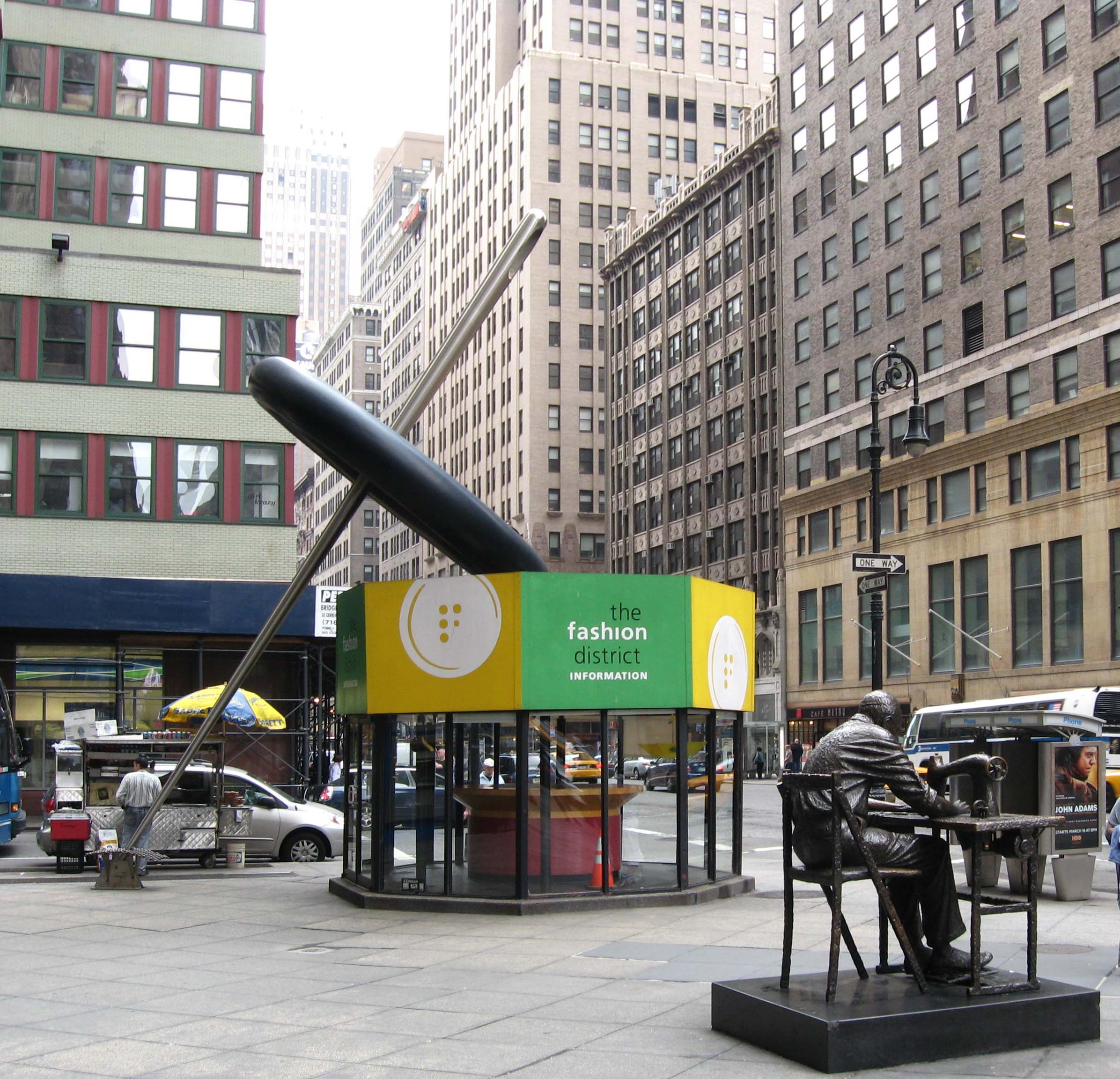
An information booth in the Garment District and a sculpture (background), Needle threading a button

With $9 billion in annual sales in 2011, New York City is the United States' top "global fashion city." The core of the industry is Manhattan's Garment District, where the majority of the city's major fashion labels operate showrooms and execute the fashion process from design and production to wholesaling. No other city has a comparable concentration of fashion businesses and talent in a single district.

The Garment District contains a concentration of fashion designers, production facilities, warehouses, showrooms, and material suppliers. Industry professionals describe this network of businesses and suppliers as an interdependent ecosystem. Major fashion labels such as Carolina Herrera, Oscar de la Renta, Calvin Klein, Donna Karan, Liz Claiborne, Nicole Miller, Ben-Amun, and Andrew Marc have showrooms, production facilities, or support offices located in the Garment District.

While historically known as the center of textile manufacturing, global trends have changed the way the fashion industry in the Garment District functions. Over the last 50 years, New York's garment manufacturing sector has experienced a steady decline within the City overall and within the Fashion District specifically. This has occurred as a result of high Manhattan rents, domestic manufacturers becoming less competitive in the global marketplace, in addition to the outsourcing of clothes manufacturing to lower-cost foreign markets.

The Garment District began to diminish as part of a general decline in the city's manufacturing sector. In 1987, the New York City government created the Special Garment Center District zoning (SGCD) to help preserve garment manufacturing. According to the New York City government website, the zone encloses an area bordered by West 35th and West 40th Streets, Broadway and Ninth Avenue. The zoning placed restrictions on manufacturing on large portions of the Garment District in an effort to keep manufacturing rent affordable. However, the City's use of zoning as a job retention tool did not achieve its goal, and manufacturing has continued to decline at the same pace after the zoning was enacted as it did before the preservation measures were in place. This issue has been visited and revisited by policy makers, fashion industry representatives, manufacturing and union representatives and owners of property in the district, but the fate of the district remains uncertain.

== History ==
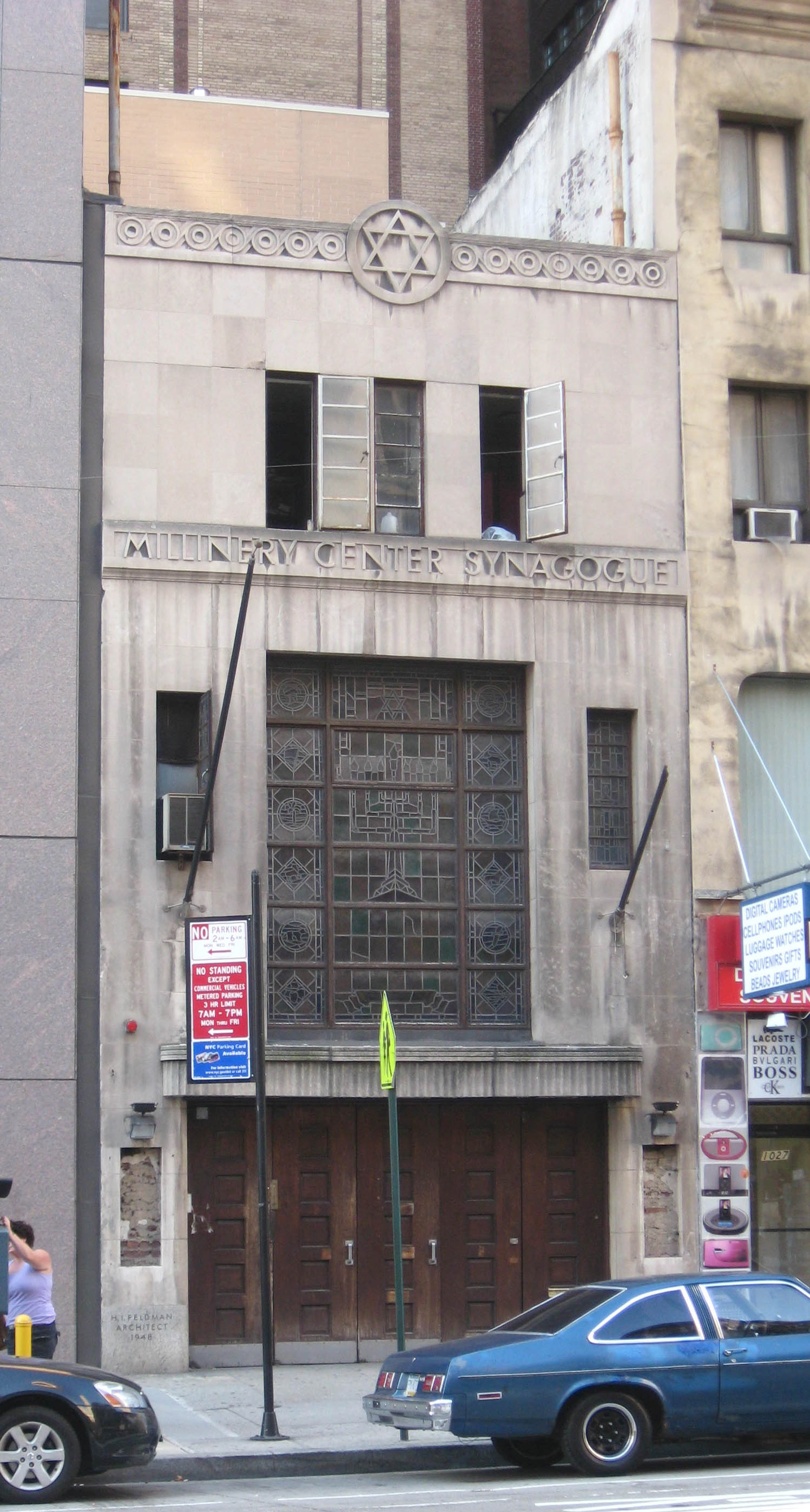
Millinery Center Synagogue in the Garment District

=== 19th century ===
New York City first assumed its role as the center of the nation's garment industry by producing clothes for enslaved people working on Southern plantations. It was more efficient for the enslavers to buy clothes from producers in New York City than to have the enslaved people spend time and labor making the clothing themselves. In addition to supplying clothing for enslaved people, tailors produced other ready-made garments for sailors and western prospectors during slack periods in their regular business.

Prior to the mid-18th century, the majority of Americans either made their own clothing, or if they were wealthy, purchased "tailor-made" customized clothing. By the 1820s, however, an increasing number of ready-made garments of a higher quality were being produced for a broader market. The production of ready-made clothing, which continued to grow, completed its transformation to an "industrialized" profession with the invention of the sewing machine in the 1850s. The need for thousands of ready-made soldiers' uniforms during the American Civil War helped the garment industry to expand further.

Women were the main workforce before 1840. However, by 1880 men took most of the skilled positions previously held by women due to the massive migration of Jewish men from Poland and Russia. Many of them were tailors that adapted to machine production. German and Central European immigrants to America around the mid-19th century arrived on the scene with relevant business experience and skills just as garment production was passing from a proto-industrial phase to a more advanced stage of manufacture. In the early twentieth-century a largely Eastern European immigrant workforce powered the garment trades. Russian Jews recruited workers from their hometowns and broke the production into tasks able to do by less-skilled workers. Writing in 1917, Abraham Cahan credited these immigrants with the creation of American style:

Foreigners ourselves, and mostly unable to speak English, we had Americanized the system of providing clothes for the American woman of moderate or humble means. The average American woman is the best-dressed woman in the world, and the Russian Jew has had a good deal to do with making her one.

Due to several nationalities, the organization of workers was hard at the beginning. Before 1880, most garment workers didn't have an interest in unions, except for cutters, which were the more skilled workers. However, as Eastern European Jews increased in the industry, unionization increased in this group.

With an ample supply of cheap labor and a well-established distribution network, New York City was prepared to meet the demand. By the end of the 1860s, Americans bought most of their clothing rather than making it themselves. During the 1870s, the value of garments produced in New York increased sixfold. By 1880 New York produced more garments than its four closest urban competitors combined. Two out of five ready-to-wear garments were produced in New York City. In 1900 the value and output of the clothing trade was three times that of the city's second largest industry, sugar refining.

=== 20th century ===
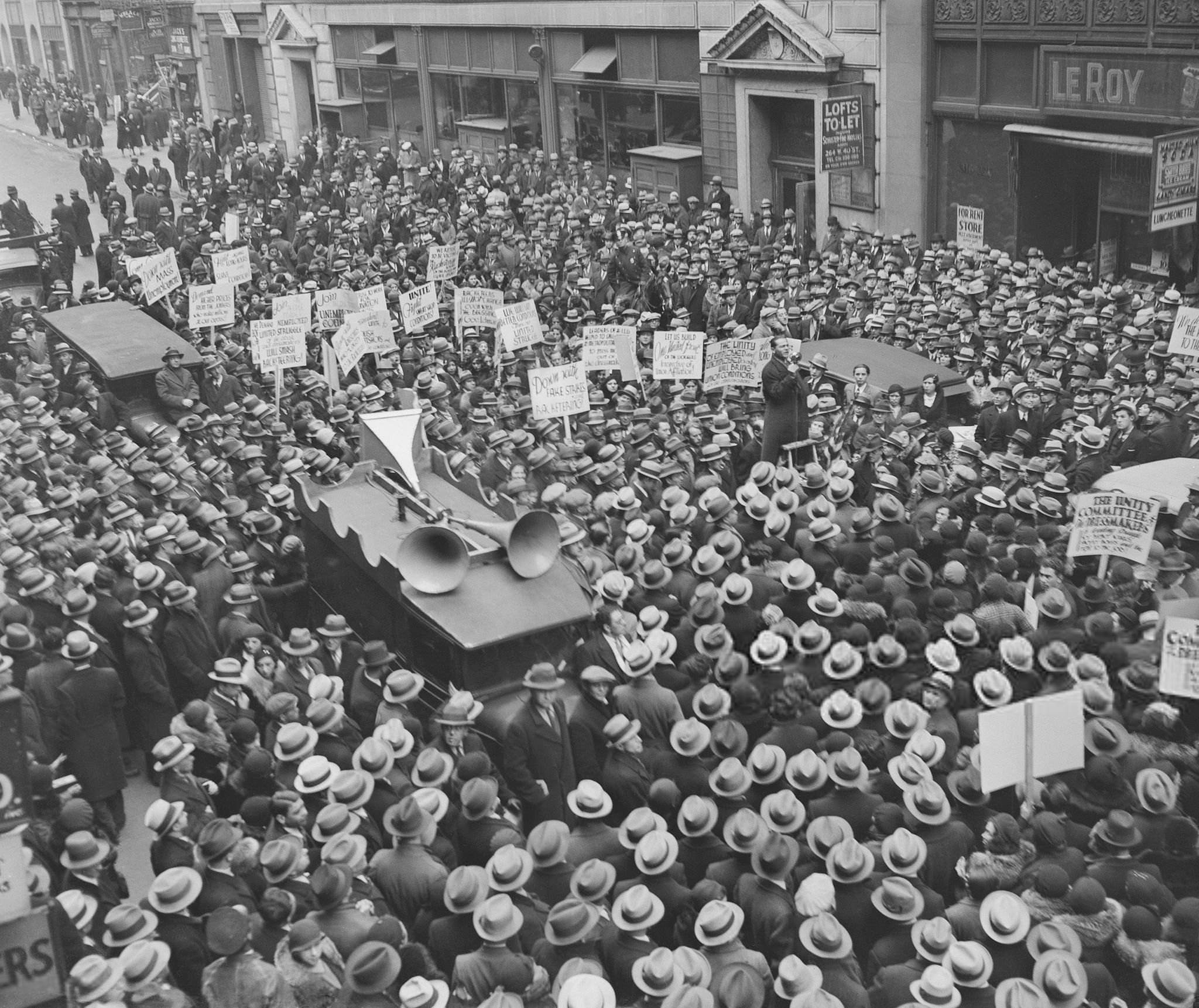
Ben Gold, Secretary-Treasurer of the Needle Trades Workers Industrial Union, speaks at a workers demonstration in the Garment District, February 1, 1933

In 1909, leading industries in New York City were manufacturers of clothes for women and men, and New York's function as America's culture and fashion center also helped the garment industry by providing constantly changing styles and new demand; in 1910, 70% of the nation's women's clothing and 40% of the men's was produced in New York City.

Cheaper overseas labor and production has dramatically affected the New York industry for decades. This change has forced many designers who once manufactured their lines in the city to shift production overseas, which has in turn affected small cutting and sewing rooms as well as zipper, button, and supply stores in the Garment District. As Charles Bagli of The New York Times wrote:

Some city officials and industry leaders worry that if manufacturing is wiped out, many of the designers who bring so much luster to New York will leave, along with the city's claim to be a fashion capital rivaling Paris and Milan. The damage would be undeniable, given that the industry's two big annual events—Fashion Week in September and February—attract enormous numbers of visitors and generate hundreds of millions of dollars in economic activity.

— Charles Bagli, for the New York Times

The Garment District Alliance, a nonprofit business improvement district that promotes the Garment District as a strategic business location for fashion and non-fashion-related businesses, is engaged in various efforts to revive and maintain the Garment District's economic vibrancy. For example, the Garment District Alliance organized a Fashion Walk of Fame on 7th Avenue, Arts Festivals, and a Garment District Information Kiosk located on 7th Avenue that provides sourcing information and industry-related services to fashion professionals, students, hobbyists, visitors, and shoppers.

Save the Garment Center is a campaign that was created by several members of the fashion industry in an effort to preserve the concentration of fashion industry-related uses in the district. However, as fashion manufacturing declines, many buildings that once housed these large facilities have been converted to office space. Businesses such as accountants, lawyers, public relations and many high-tech companies have moved into the area, and the area is now divided equally between fashion and non-fashion companies.

Between 1990 and 2000, the district's population grew from 2,500 to 10,281.

=== 21st century ===
The Garment Center Historic District between Sixth Avenue, 35th Street, Ninth Avenue, and 41st Street was listed on the National Register of Historic Places in 2008, with 215 contributing properties and 36 non-contributing structures.

The Garment District suffered during the COVID-19 pandemic, losing both tenants and tourists that populated the area, while open-air drug use increased. Investments from New York State's "NY Forward" fund have been made into non-profits and community oriented businesses to bolster the area and NYC fashion industry, but social activists argue that more needs to be done for enforcement of narcotic related violations in order for the area to recover.

On August 14, 2025, the New York City Council approved the Midtown South Mixed-Use Plan (MSMX), rezoning 42 blocks from manufacturing-only to mixed-use zoning. The plan, described as the largest residential neighborhood rezoning in New York City in two decades, is projected to enable over 9,500 new housing units, including more than 2,800 permanently affordable units, along with over $448 million in community investments, including a $122 million fund to support garment industry businesses. Two days earlier, on August 12, the New York City Landmarks Preservation Commission designated five early 20th-century garment industry buildings as individual landmarks, coordinated with the rezoning to preserve the neighborhood's architectural and labor heritage.

== Transportation ==
The Garment District is within walking distance of Penn Station, serving the New Jersey Transit, Amtrak, and Long Island Rail Road, and Grand Central Terminal, serving the Metro-North Railroad. The New York City Subway has stations at 34th Street–Herald Square, 34th Street–Seventh Avenue, 34th Street–Eighth Avenue, Times Square–42nd Street/Port Authority Bus Terminal, and 42nd Street–Bryant Park/Fifth Avenue. The Port Authority Bus Terminal is at Eighth Avenue and 41st Street, and PATH is nearby at 33rd Street and Sixth Avenue.

== Visitor attractions ==
- The Fashion Walk of Fame is the only permanent landmark dedicated to American fashion
- Needle Threading A Button – sculpture at the Fashion Center Business Improvement District's Information Kiosk at Seventh Avenue and 39th Street
- The Garment Worker – sculpture at 7th Avenue and West 39th Street by Judith Weller

== See also ==
- National Register of Historic Places listings in Manhattan from 14th to 59th Streets
