= Pincushion =

Small cushion used to store pins and needles

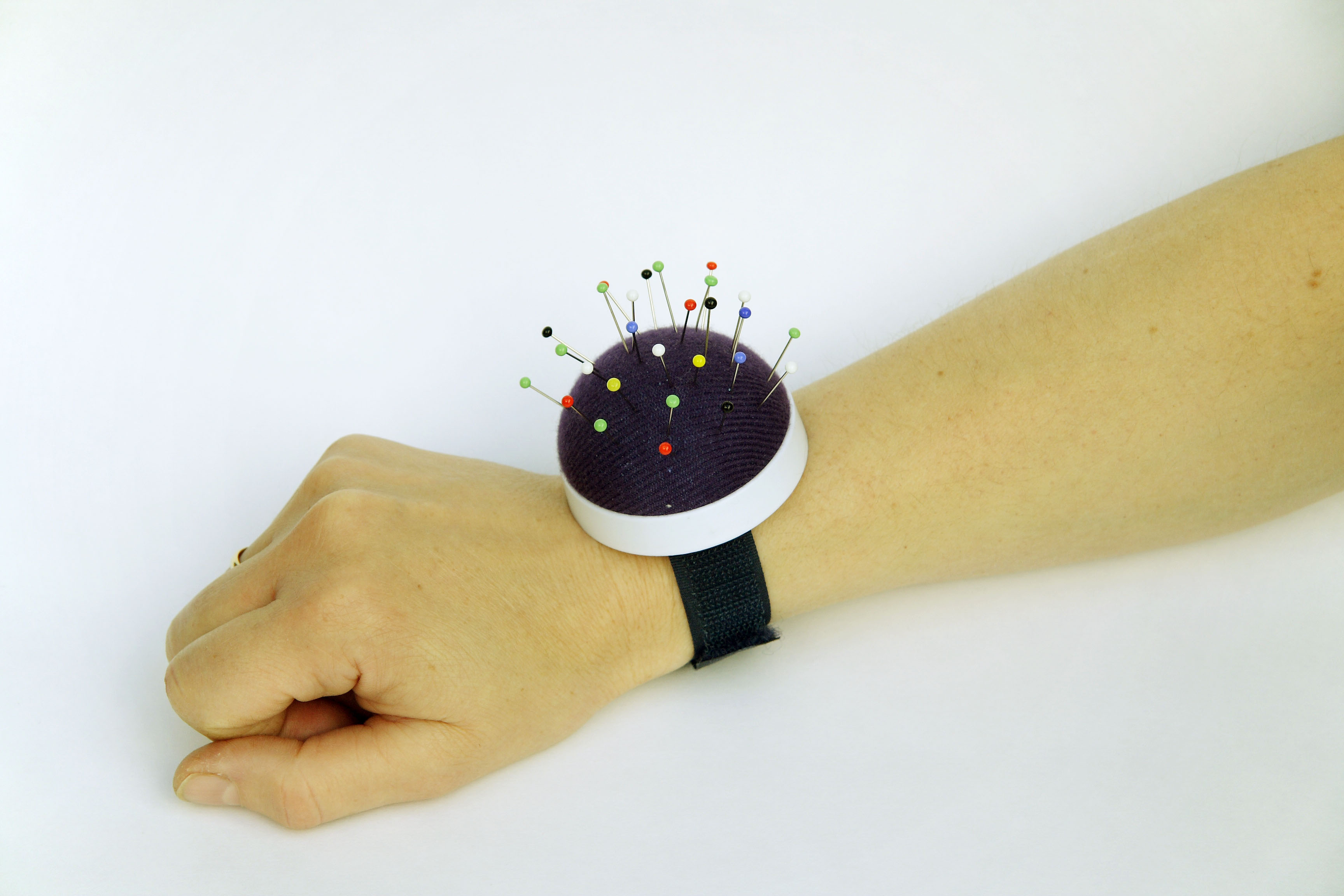
A wrist-held pincushion

A pincushion (or pin cushion) is a small, stuffed cushion, typically 3–5 cm (1.2–2.0 in) across, which is used in sewing to store pins or needles with their heads protruding to take hold of them easily, collect them, and keep them organized.

Pincushions are typically filled tightly with stuffing to hold pins rigidly in place. Magnetic pin cushions are also sometimes used; though technically they are not "cushions", they serve the same basic function of holding pins neatly.

== History ==
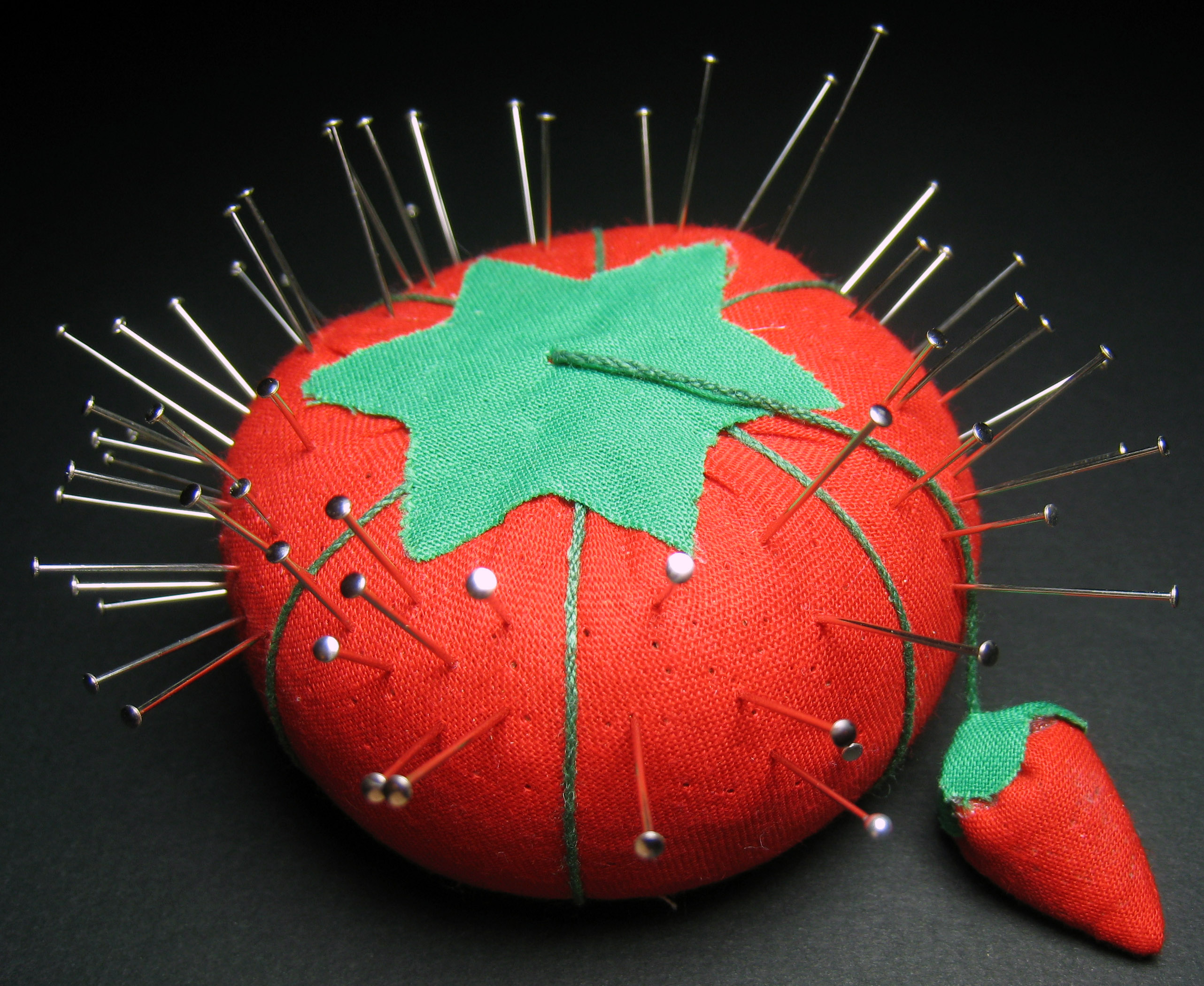
Typical "tomato and strawberry" pincushion.

The recorded origins of pincushions date back to the Middle Ages of Europe. In the English language, they became known by many names: "pimpilowes, pimpilos, pimplos, pimploes, pin-pillows, pin-poppets". In 1376, Jehanne de Mesnil was bequeathed a silver pin case in a French text called Testament of Advice written by a woman known as La Monteure, from Rouen. Other references to pin cases during the Medieval era exist. By the 16th century, these were supplanted by references to "pin pillows". Some examples from various parts of Europe survive that have elaborate embroidery. Small porcelain baskets with a pin cushion inside were highly popular, as were small cushions, such as wedding pillows or maternity pillows, embroidered with messages. Typically, the pincushion was filled with cotton, wool, horsehair, or sawdust, though some were filled with emery powder, an abrasive to clean and sharpen the pins. During the 18th century, weighted pincushions became popular among seamstresses. In England, seam clamps attached to a table and designed for holding hems for sewing became common and were often in the shape of a bird (the tail would be pinched to open and close the "beak" to hold the fabric), attached to the back of the bird was a velvet pin cushion.

One especially popular design is that of a tomato, often with a small attached strawberry containing emery powder. The tomato design was most likely introduced during the Victorian Era. It is commonly stated that the origin of this design was a belief that placing a tomato on the mantel of a new house guaranteed prosperity and repelled evil spirits and that if tomatoes were out of season, families improvised by using a round ball of red fabric filled with sand or sawdust, which also became a place to store pins. However, this statement appears to have no basis in historical fact, and pincushions in the shapes of many different vegetables were common in the Victorian Era.

== Pincushion dolls ==
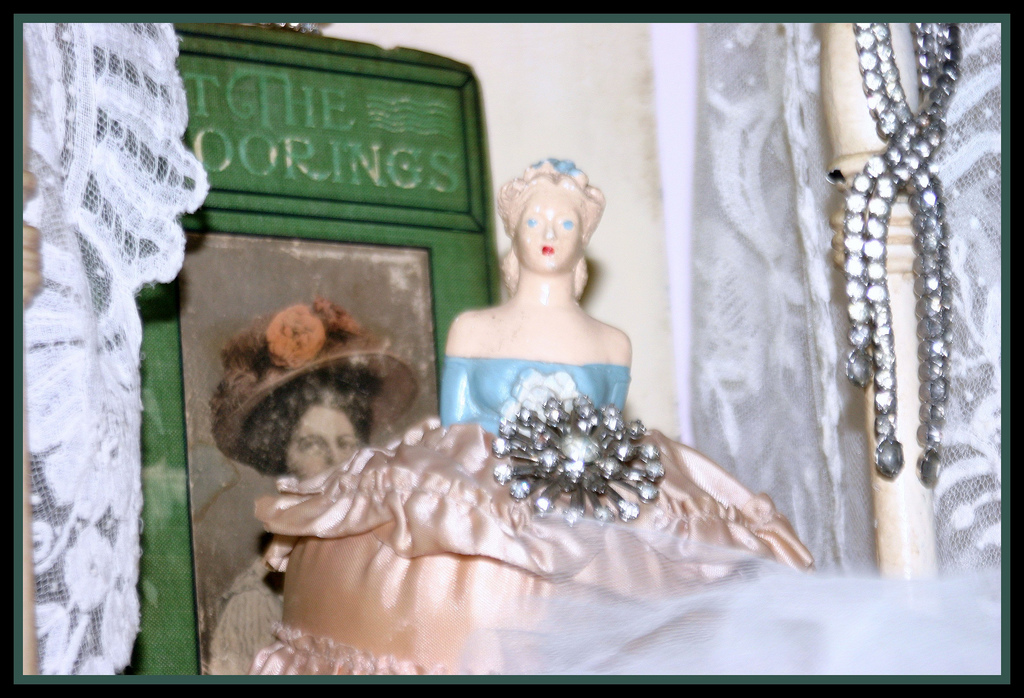
Vintage pincushion doll.

Porcelain pincushion dolls, or half-dolls, were fashionable in late 19th-century Europe and remain collectible today. Millions were made and sold during the 19th century, but due to their fragility, examples in excellent condition remain scarce. The form resembles a typical china figurine of a beautiful woman. The porcelain doll ends at the waist, where holes are included in the design to allow the half-doll to be stitched to a pincushion. The pincushion half of the doll may be made of satin fabric and trimmings to resemble a skirt.

The original popularity of the pincushion dolls continued into the early 20th century, and some styles reflect Art Deco or similar 20th-century styles. The most collectible examples are from pre-World War II Dresden and Meissen, which may sell for around $500 US when the condition is perfect. More common designs in imperfect condition sell for less than $25 US. Similar dolls were produced to top the covers of tissue boxes, jewelry boxes, or tea pot cosies. Some uncommon examples are nude and have a risque style.

== See also ==
- Biscornu, a type of pin cushion used in the 1990s
