= Net (polyhedron) =

Edge-joined polygons which fold into a polyhedron

A net of a regular dodecahedron

The eleven nets of a cube

In geometry, a net of a polyhedron is an arrangement of non-overlapping edge-joined polygons in the plane that can be folded (along edges) to become the faces of the polyhedron. Polyhedral nets are a useful aid to the study of polyhedra and solid geometry in general, as they allow for physical models of polyhedra to be constructed from material such as thin cardboard.

An early instance of polyhedral nets appears in the works of Albrecht Dürer, whose 1525 book A Course in the Art of Measurement with Compass and Ruler (Unterweysung der Messung mit dem Zyrkel und Rychtscheyd) included nets for the Platonic solids and several of the Archimedean solids. These constructions were first called nets in 1543 by Augustin Hirschvogel.

== Existence and uniqueness ==
Four hexagons that, when glued to form a regular octahedron as depicted, produce folds across three of the diagonals of each hexagon. The edges between the hexagons remain unfolded.

Many different nets can exist for a given polyhedron, depending on the choices of which edges are joined and which are separated. The edges that are cut from a convex polyhedron to form a net must form a spanning tree of the polyhedron, but cutting some spanning trees may cause the polyhedron to self-overlap when unfolded, rather than forming a net. Conversely, a given net may fold into more than one different convex polyhedron, depending on the angles at which its edges are folded and the choice of which edges to glue together. If a net is given together with a pattern for gluing its edges together, such that each vertex of the resulting shape has positive angular defect and such that the sum of these defects is exactly 4π, then there necessarily exists exactly one polyhedron that can be folded from it; this is Alexandrov's uniqueness theorem. However, the polyhedron formed in this way may have different faces than the ones specified as part of the net: some of the net polygons may have folds across them, and some of the edges between net polygons may remain unfolded. Additionally, the same net may have multiple valid gluing patterns, leading to different folded polyhedra.

Unsolved problem in mathematics
Does every convex polyhedron have a simple edge unfolding?
More unsolved problems in mathematics

In 1975, G. C. Shephard asked whether every convex polyhedron has at least one planar net, or simple edge-unfolding. This question, which is also known as Dürer's conjecture, or Dürer's unfolding problem, remains unanswered. There exist non-convex polyhedra that do not have nets, and it is possible to subdivide the faces of every convex polyhedron (for instance along a cut locus) so that the set of subdivided faces has a net. In 2014 Mohammad Ghomi showed that every convex polyhedron admits a net after an affine transformation. Furthermore, in 2019 Barvinok and Ghomi showed that a generalization of Dürer's conjecture fails for pseudo edges, i.e., a network of geodesics which connect vertices of the polyhedron and form a graph with convex faces.

Blooming a regular dodecahedron

A related open question asks whether every net of a convex polyhedron has a blooming, a continuous non-self-intersecting motion from its flat to its folded state that keeps each face flat throughout the motion.

== Shortest path ==
The shortest path over the surface between two points on the surface of a polyhedron corresponds to a straight line on a suitable net for the subset of faces touched by the path. The net has to be such that the straight line is fully within it, and one may have to consider several nets to see which gives the shortest path. For example, in the case of a cube, if the points are on adjacent faces one candidate for the shortest path is the path crossing the common edge; the shortest path of this kind is found using a net where the two faces are also adjacent. Other candidates for the shortest path are through the surface of a third face adjacent to both (of which there are two), and corresponding nets can be used to find the shortest path in each category.

The spider and the fly problem is a recreational mathematics puzzle which involves finding the shortest path between two points on a cuboid.

== Higher-dimensional polytope nets ==
The Dalí cross, one of the 261 nets of the tesseract

A net of a 4-polytope, a four-dimensional polytope, is composed of polyhedral cells that are connected by their faces and all occupy the same three-dimensional space, just as the polygon faces of a net of a polyhedron are connected by their edges and all occupy the same plane. The net of the tesseract, the four-dimensional hypercube, is used prominently in a painting by Salvador Dalí, Crucifixion (Corpus Hypercubus) (1954). The same tesseract net is central to the plot of the short story "—And He Built a Crooked House—" by Robert A. Heinlein.

The number of combinatorially distinct nets of $n$-dimensional hypercubes can be found by representing these nets as a tree on $2n$ nodes describing the pattern by which pairs of faces of the hypercube are glued together to form a net, together with a perfect matching on the complement graph of the tree describing the pairs of faces that are opposite each other on the folded hypercube. Using this representation, the number of different unfoldings for hypercubes of dimensions 2, 3, 4, ... have been counted as

1, 11, 261, 9694, 502110, 33064966, 2642657228, ... (sequence A091159 in the OEIS)

== See also ==
- Cardboard modeling
- Common net
- Paper model
- UV mapping
