= List of French-language academic journals =

This is a list of notable peer-reviewed academic, including scientific, journals in French, by discipline.

== Humanities and social sciences ==
=== Archaeology ===
- Bulletin de l'Institut français d'archéologie orientale
- Bulletin de la Société préhistorique française
- Gallia Préhistoire
- Revue du Nord
- Revue archéologique

=== Architecture ===
- L'Architecture d'Aujourd'hui

=== Economy and management ===
- Revue économique

=== Geography ===
- Annales de géographie

=== History ===
- Annales : Histoire, sciences sociales
- Annales du service des antiquités de l'Égypte
- L'Année épigraphique
- Bibliothèque de l'École des chartes
- Français de Suisse
- L'Histoire
- Le Mouvement social
- Revue archéologique
- Revue belge de philologie et d'histoire
- Revue des Deux Mondes
- Revue d'histoire moderne et contemporaine

=== Philosophy ===
- Le Débat
- Noesis
- Revue de synthèse
- Revue philosophique de la France et de l'étranger
- Revue de métaphysique et de morale
- Tiqqun

=== Psychology, psychoanalysis and social psychology ===
- Annales médico-psychologiques

=== Theology and Religion ===
- Théologie Chrétienne Africaine (publie des articles en français, en anglais, et en portugais ; tous les articles sont publiés avec un résumé trilingue, rédigé dans chacune de ces trois langues)
- Cahiers des Religions Africaines
- Cameroon Journal of Evangelical Theology (publie des articles en anglais et en français)
- Études Théologiques et Religieuses
- Missiologie évangélique
- Le Sycamore : Revue de traduction biblique
- Relier : Revue Interdisciplinaire d’Études Religieuses
- Théologiques : Revue Interdisciplinaire d’Études Religieuses

== Natural sciences ==
=== Agronomy ===
- Cahiers Agricultures

=== Chemistry ===
- Annales de chimie et de physique

=== Environment ===
- Écoscience

=== Medicine ===
- Médecine/Sciences
- Revue médicale suisse

=== Geology ===
- Comptes Rendus Geoscience

== Formal sciences ==
=== Mathematics ===
- Acta Arithmetica
- Annales Henri Lebesgue
- Annales de l'Institut Fourier
- Bulletin de la Société Mathématique de France
- Comptes Rendus de l'Académie des Sciences
- Comptes Rendus Mathématique
- Journal de Théorie des Nombres de Bordeaux
- Journal canadien de mathématiques
- Publications mathématiques de l'IHÉS

=== Physics ===
- L'Astronomie

== Arts ==
=== Music ===
- Volume!

== Portals ==
Most French-language online journals in the humanities and social sciences are grouped together in these portals:

- HAL (open archive)
- Cairn
- OpenEdition Journals (previously: revues.org)
- Gallica

== See also ==
- Francophonie
