= Regular dodecahedron =

Solid with 12 equal pentagonal faces

- Type: Platonic solid, Truncated trapezohedron, Goldberg polyhedron
- Faces: 12 regular pentagons
- Edges: 30
- Vertices: 20
- Symmetry group: icosahedral symmetry $\mathrm{I}_\mathrm{h}$
- Dihedral angle (degrees): 116.565°
- Dual polyhedron: regular icosahedron
- Properties: convex, regular

Net

A regular dodecahedron or pentagonal dodecahedron is a dodecahedron (a polyhedron with 12 faces) composed of regular pentagonal faces, three meeting at each vertex. It is one of the Platonic solids, described in Plato's dialogues as the shape of the universe itself. Johannes Kepler used the dodecahedron in his 1596 model of the Solar System. However, the dodecahedron and other Platonic solids had already been described by other philosophers since antiquity.

The regular dodecahedron is a truncated trapezohedron because it is the result of truncating axial vertices of a pentagonal trapezohedron. It is also a Goldberg polyhedron because it is the initial polyhedron to construct new polyhedra by the process of chamfering. It has a relation with other Platonic solids, one of them is the regular icosahedron as its dual polyhedron. Other new polyhedra can be constructed by using a regular dodecahedron.

The regular dodecahedron's metric properties and construction are associated with the golden ratio. The regular dodecahedron is featured in some artistic and narrative works. Some toys and artifacts are also shaped like regular dodecahedra, including the Roman dodecahedron. Regular dodecahedra can also be found in nature and supramolecules, as well as the shape of the universe. The skeleton of a regular dodecahedron can be represented as the graph called the dodecahedral graph, a Platonic graph. Its property of the Hamiltonian, a path that visits all of its vertices exactly once, can be found in a toy called icosian game.

== As a Platonic solid ==
=== Descriptions ===
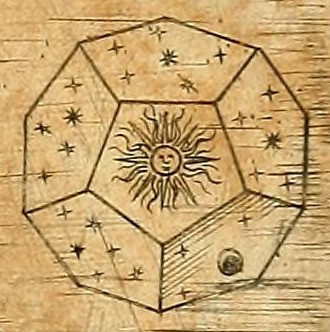
Regular dodecahedron painting by Johannes Kepler

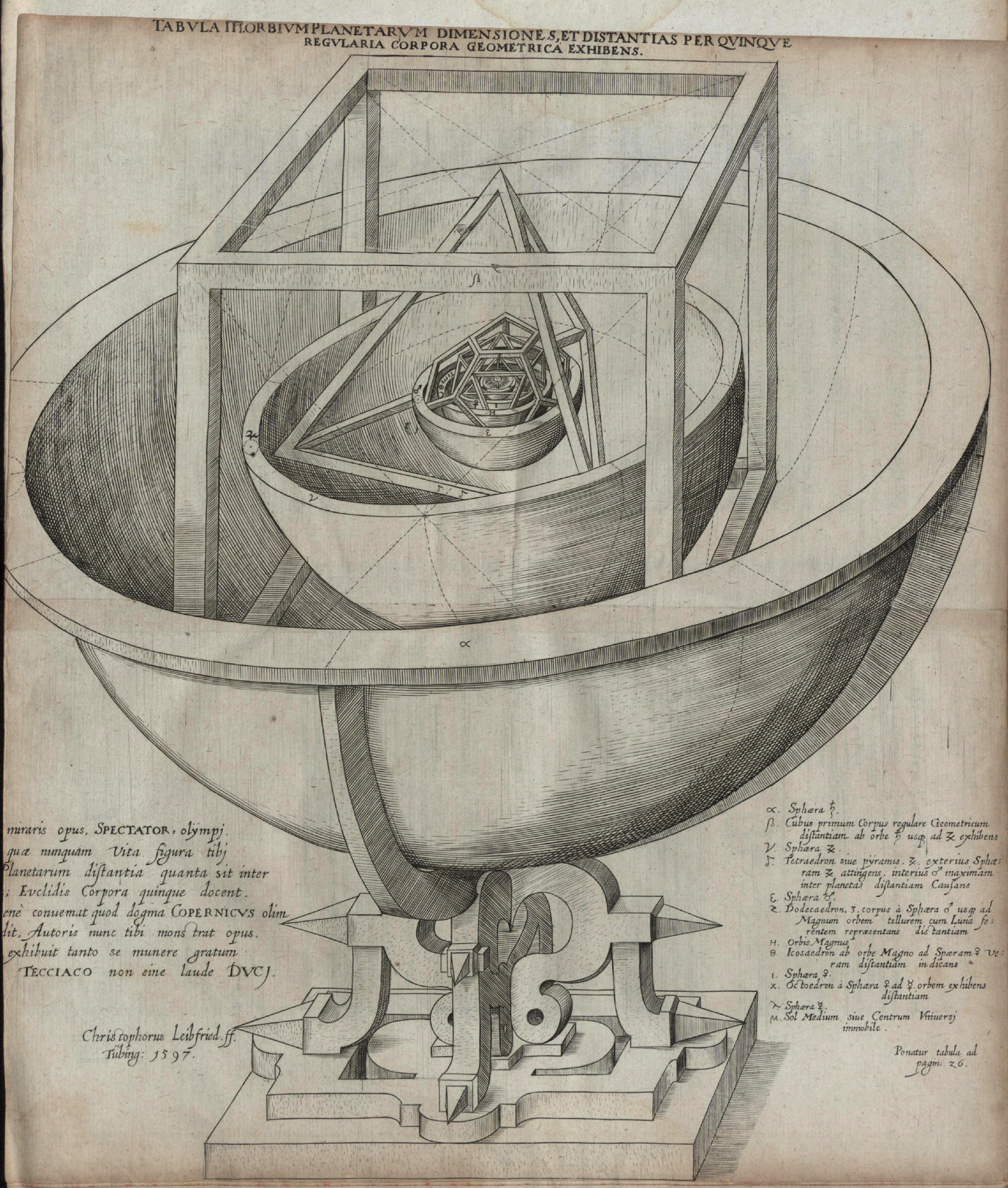
Kepler's Platonic solid model of the Solar System

The regular dodecahedron is a polyhedron with twelve pentagonal faces, thirty edges, and twenty vertices. It is one of the Platonic solids, a set of polyhedrons in which the faces are regular polygons that are congruent and the same number of faces meet at a vertex. This set of polyhedrons is named after Plato. In Theaetetus, a dialogue of Plato, Plato hypothesized that the classical elements were made of the five uniform regular solids. Plato described the regular dodecahedron, obscurely remarked, "...the god used [it] for arranging the constellations on the whole heaven". Timaeus, as a personage of Plato's dialogue, associates the other four Platonic solids—regular tetrahedron, cube, regular octahedron, and regular icosahedron—with the four classical elements, adding that there is a fifth solid pattern which, though commonly associated with the regular dodecahedron, is never directly mentioned as such; "this God used in the delineation of the universe." Aristotle also postulated that the heavens were made of a fifth element, which he called aithêr (aether in Latin, ether in American English).

Following its attribution with nature by Plato, Johannes Kepler in his Harmonices Mundi sketched each of the Platonic solids, one of them is a regular dodecahedron. In his Mysterium Cosmographicum, Kepler also proposed the Solar System by using the Platonic solids setting into another one and separating them with six spheres resembling the six planets. The ordered solids started from the innermost to the outermost: regular octahedron, regular icosahedron, regular dodecahedron, regular tetrahedron, and cube.

3D model of a regular dodecahedron

Many antiquity philosophers described the regular dodecahedron, including the rest of the Platonic solids. Theaetetus gave a mathematical description of all five and may have been responsible for the first known proof that no other convex regular polyhedra exist. Euclid completely mathematically described the Platonic solids in the Elements, the last book (Book XIII) of which is devoted to their properties. Propositions 13–17 in Book XIII describe the construction of the tetrahedron, octahedron, cube, icosahedron, and dodecahedron in that order. For each solid, Euclid finds the ratio of the diameter of the circumscribed sphere to the edge length. In Proposition 18 he argues that there are no further convex regular polyhedra. Iamblichus states that Hippasus, a Pythagorean, perished in the sea, because he boasted that he first divulged "the sphere with the twelve pentagons".

The regular dodecahedron, as the family of Platonic solids, is a regular polyhedron. It is isogonal, isohedral, and isotoxal: any two vertices, two faces, and two edges of a regular dodecahedron can be transformed by rotations and reflections under its symmetry orbit respectively, which preserves the appearance.

=== Relation to the regular icosahedron ===
The regular icosahedron inside the regular dodecahedron

The dual polyhedron of a dodecahedron is the regular icosahedron. One property of the dual polyhedron generally is that the original polyhedron and its dual share the same three-dimensional symmetry group. In the case of the regular dodecahedron, it has the same symmetry as the regular icosahedron, the icosahedral symmetry $\mathrm{I}_\mathrm{h}$. The regular dodecahedron has ten three-fold axes passing through pairs of opposite vertices, six five-fold axes passing through the opposite faces centers, and fifteen two-fold axes passing through the opposite sides midpoints.

When a regular dodecahedron is inscribed in a sphere, it occupies more of the sphere's volume (≈ 66.49%) than an icosahedron inscribed in the same sphere (≈ 60.55%). The result of both spheres' volumes initially began from the problem by ancient Greeks, determining which of two shapes has a larger volume: an icosahedron inscribed in a sphere, or a dodecahedron inscribed in the same sphere. The problem was solved by Hero of Alexandria, Pappus of Alexandria, and Fibonacci, among others. Apollonius of Perga discovered the curious result that the ratio of volumes of these two shapes is the same as the ratio of their surface areas. Both volumes have formulas involving the golden ratio but are taken to different powers.

Golden rectangle may also related to both regular icosahedron and regular dodecahedron. The regular icosahedron can be constructed by intersecting three golden rectangles perpendicularly, arranged in two-by-two orthogonal, and connecting each of the golden rectangle's vertices with a segment line. There are 12 regular icosahedron vertices, considered as the center of 12 regular dodecahedron faces.

=== Relation to the regular tetrahedron ===
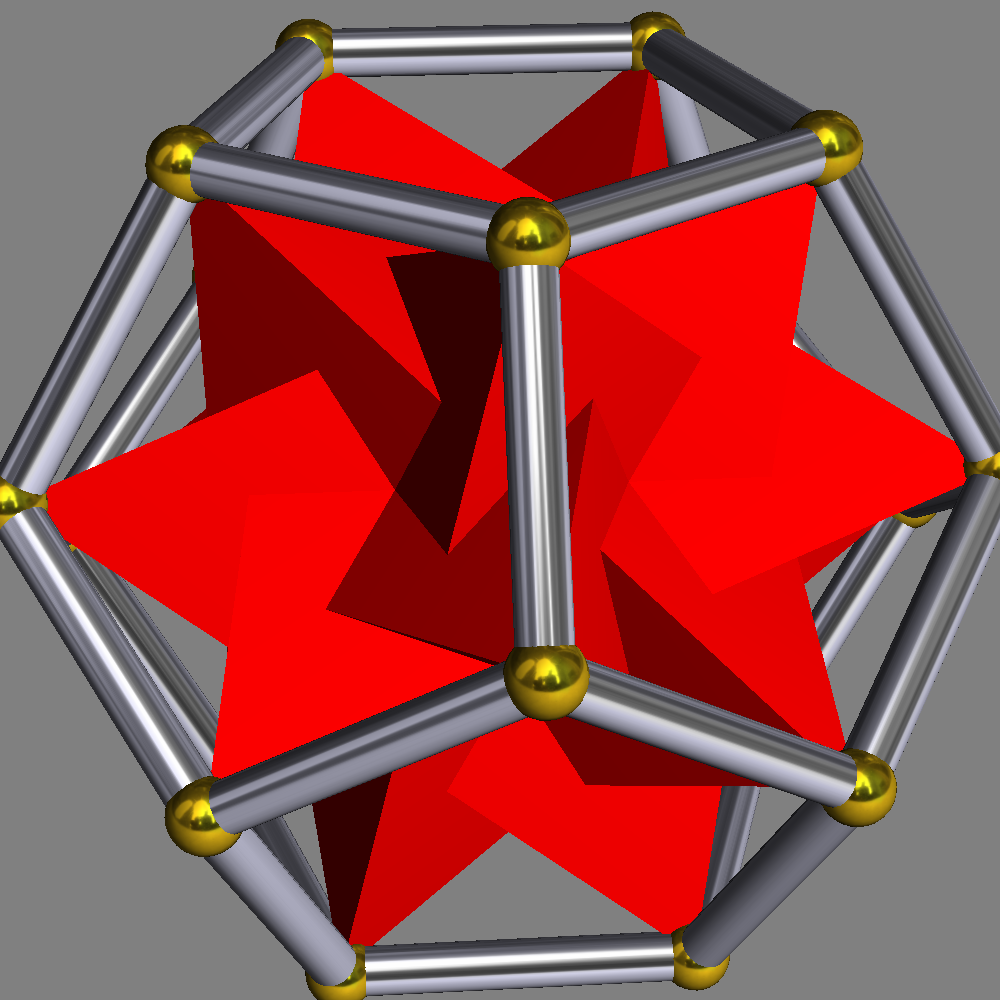
Five tetrahedra inscribed in a dodecahedron. Five opposing tetrahedra (not shown) can also be inscribed.

As two opposing tetrahedra can be inscribed in a cube, and five cubes can be inscribed in a dodecahedron, ten tetrahedra in five cubes can be inscribed in a dodecahedron: two opposing sets of five, with each set covering all 20 vertices and each vertex in two tetrahedra (one from each set, but not the opposing pair). As stated by Coxeter et al. (1938),

"Just as a tetrahedron can be inscribed in a cube, so a cube can be inscribed in a dodecahedron. By reciprocation, this leads to an octahedron circumscribed about an icosahedron. In fact, each of the twelve vertices of the icosahedron divides an edge of the octahedron according to the "golden section". Given the icosahedron, the circumscribed octahedron can be chosen in five ways, giving a compound of five octahedra, which comes under our definition of stellated icosahedron. (The reciprocal compound, of five cubes whose vertices belong to a dodecahedron, is a stellated triacontahedron.) Another stellated icosahedron can at once be deduced, by stellating each octahedron into a stella octangula, thus forming a compound of ten tetrahedra. Further, we can choose one tetrahedron from each stella octangula, so as to derive a compound of five tetrahedra, which still has all the rotation symmetry of the icosahedron (i.e. the icosahedral group), although it has lost the reflections. By reflecting this figure in any plane of symmetry of the icosahedron, we obtain the complementary set of five tetrahedra. These two sets of five tetrahedra are enantiomorphous, i.e. not directly congruent, but related like a pair of shoes. [Such] a figure which possesses no plane of symmetry (so that it is enantiomorphous to its mirror-image) is said to be chiral."

=== Configuration matrix ===
The configuration matrix is a matrix in which the rows and columns correspond to the elements of a polyhedron as in the vertices, edges, and faces. The diagonal of a matrix denotes the number of each element that appears in a polyhedron, whereas the non-diagonal of a matrix denotes the number of the column's elements that occur in or at the row's element. The regular dodecahedron can be represented in the following matrix:
$$\begin{bmatrix}
20 & 3 & 3 \\
2 & 30 & 2 \\
5 & 5 & 12
\end{bmatrix}$$

== Relation to the golden ratio ==
The golden ratio is the ratio between two numbers equal to the ratio of their sum to the larger of the two quantities. It is one of two roots of a polynomial, expressed as $\phi = (1 + \sqrt{5})/2 \approx 1.618$. As follow, the golden ratio can be applied to the regular dodecahedron's metric properties, as well as to construct the regular dodecahedron.

The surface area $A$ and the volume $V$ of a regular dodecahedron of edge length $a$ are:
$$A = 3\sqrt{(\sqrt{5}\phi)^3}a^2, \qquad V = \frac{\sqrt{5}\phi^4}{2}a^3.$$

Cartesian coordinates of a regular dodecahedron in the following: : the orange vertices lie at (±1, ±1, ±1).; : the green vertices lie at (0, ±ϕ, ±1/ϕ) and form a rectangle on the yz-plane.; : the blue vertices lie at (±1/ϕ, 0, ±ϕ) and form a rectangle on the xz-plane.; : the pink vertices lie at (±ϕ, ±1/ϕ, 0) and form a rectangle on the xy-plane.

The following Cartesian coordinates define the twenty vertices of a regular dodecahedron centered at the origin and suitably scaled and oriented:
$$\begin{align}
(\pm 1, \pm 1, \pm 1), &\qquad (0, \pm \phi, \pm 1/\phi), \\
(\pm 1/\phi, 0, \pm \phi), &\qquad (\pm \phi, \pm 1/\phi, 0).
\end{align}$$

If the edge length of a regular dodecahedron is $a$, the radius of a circumscribed sphere $r_c$ (one that touches the regular dodecahedron at all vertices), the radius of an inscribed sphere $r_i$ (tangent to each of the regular dodecahedron's faces), and the midradius $r_m$ (one that touches the middle of each edge) are:
$$\begin{align}
r_c &= \frac{\phi \sqrt{3}}{2} a \approx 1.401a, \\
r_i &= \sqrt{\frac{\sqrt{5}\phi^5}{20}} a \approx 1.114a, \\
r_m &= \frac{\phi^2}{2}a \approx 1.309a.
\end{align}$$
Given a regular dodecahedron of edge length one, $r_c$ is the radius of a circumscribing sphere about a cube of edge length $\phi$, and $r_i$ is the apothem of a regular pentagon of edge length $\phi$.

The dihedral angle of a regular dodecahedron between every two adjacent pentagonal faces is $2 \arctan (\phi)$, approximately 116.565°.

== Other related geometric objects ==
The regular dodecahedron can be interpreted as the Goldberg polyhedron. It is a set of polyhedra containing hexagonal and pentagonal faces. Other than two Platonic solids—tetrahedron and cube—the regular dodecahedron is the initial of the Goldberg polyhedron construction, and the next polyhedron is obtained by truncating all of its edges, a process called chamfer. This process can be continuously repeated, resulting in more new Goldberg's polyhedra. These polyhedra are classified as the first class of a Goldberg polyhedron.

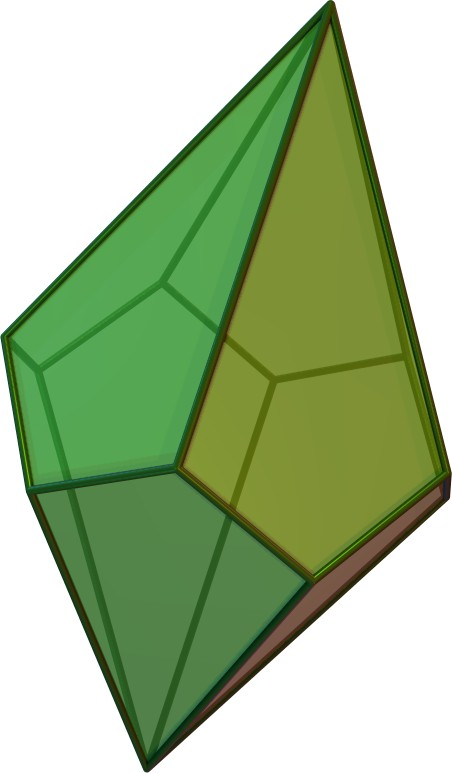
Small stellated dodecahedron and trapezohedron

The stellations of the regular dodecahedron make up three of the four Kepler–Poinsot polyhedra. The first stellation of a regular dodecahedron is constructed by attaching its layer with pentagonal pyramids, forming a small stellated dodecahedron. The second stellation is by attaching the small stellated dodecahedron with wedges, forming a great dodecahedron. The third stellation is by attaching the great dodecahedron with the sharp triangular pyramids, forming a great stellated dodecahedron.

Other related polyhedra are:

- Pentagonal trapezohedron, the commencement of constructing the regular dodecahedron by truncating its two axial vertices.
- Two Archimedean solids: truncated dodecahedron and snub dodecahedron. Respectively, these polyhedra are obtained by truncating all vertices of a regular dodecahedron and separating the pentagonal faces of a regular dodecahedron before filling the gap with equilateral triangles.
- Pentakis dodecahedron is the Kleetope of a regular dodecahedron, obtained by affixing pentagonal pyramids to each face, similar to the small stellated dodecahedron, although the difference is the pyramids' altitude. It is also a Catalan solid.
- Four Johnson solids—augmented dodecahedron, parabiaugmented dodecahedron, metabiaugmented dodecahedron, triaugmented dodecahedron—obtained by attaching one, two, or three pentagonal pyramids onto the faces of a regular dodecahedron.

== Appearances ==
=== In arts and popular cultures ===
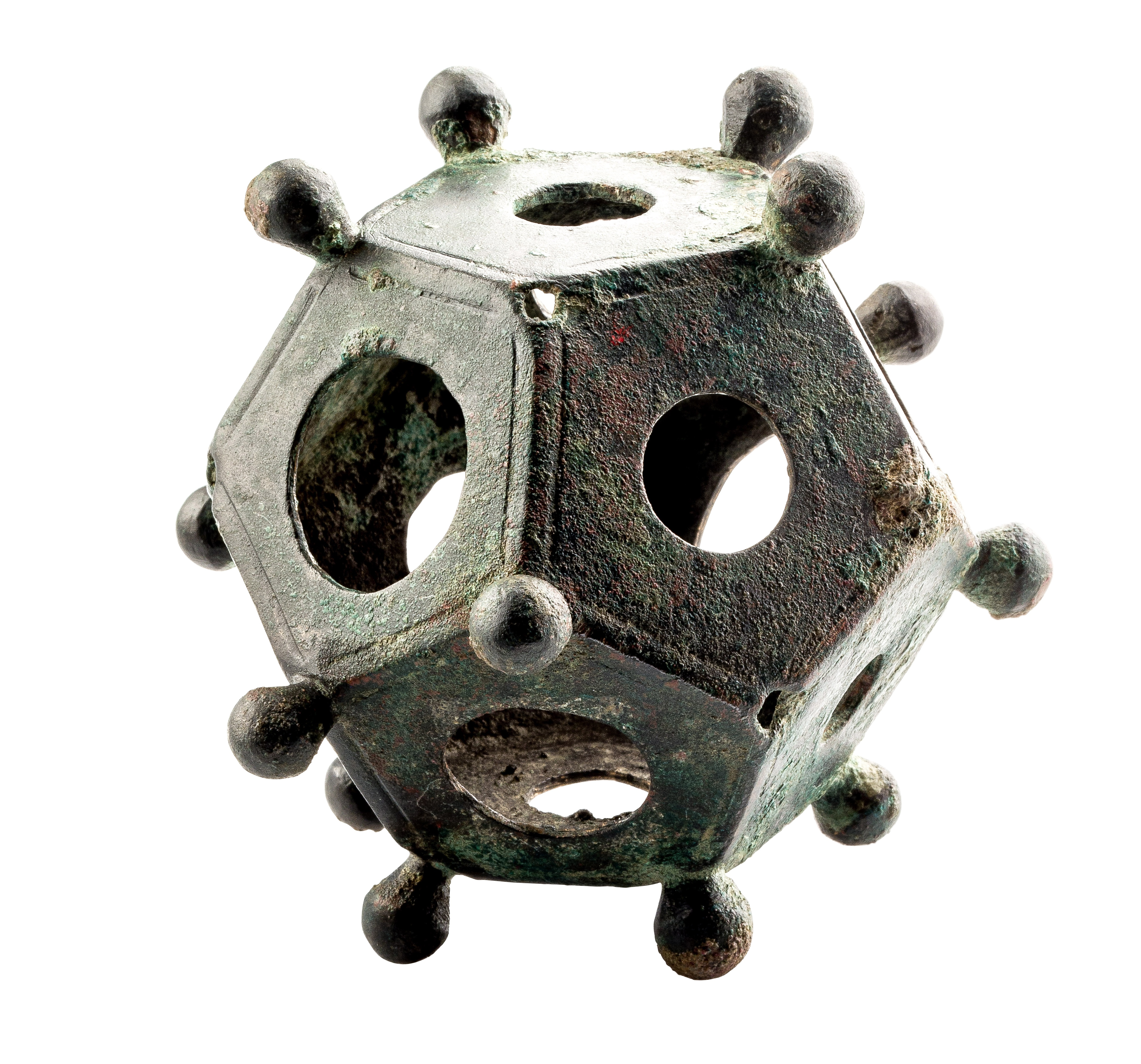
Roman dodecahedron

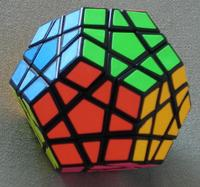
A solved six-color sided Megaminx

Regular dodecahedra have been used as dice and may also have been used as divinatory devices. Small hollow bronze Roman dodecahedra have been found in the northern parts of the Roman empire; their purpose is uncertain.

In 20th-century art, regular dodecahedra appear in the work of M. C. Escher, such as his lithographs Reptiles, and Salvador Dalí's painting The Sacrament of the Last Supper in which the room is a hollow regular dodecahedron). Gerard Caris based his entire artistic oeuvre on the regular dodecahedron and the pentagon, presented as a new art movement coined Pentagonism.

In modern role-playing games, the regular dodecahedron is often used as a twelve-sided die, one of the more common polyhedral dice. The Megaminx is a twisted puzzle similar to the Rubik's Cube but the shape is pentagonal faces dodecahedral.

In the children's novel The Phantom Tollbooth, the regular dodecahedron appears as a character in the land of Mathematics. Each face of the regular dodecahedron describes the various facial expressions, swiveling to the front as required to match his mood.

In Bertrand Russell's 1954 short story The Mathematician's Nightmare: The Vision of Professor Squarepunt, the number 5 said: "I am the number of fingers on a hand. I make pentagons and pentagrams. And but for me dodecahedra could not exist; and, as everyone knows, the universe is a dodecahedron. So, but for me, there could be no universe."

=== In nature ===
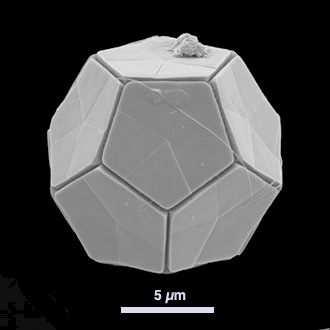
The coccolithophore Braarudosphaera bigelowii covered with a coccosphere formed of twelve pentaliths

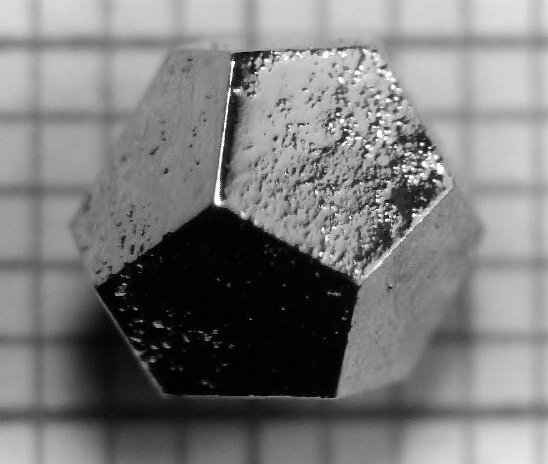
The faces of a Holmium–magnesium–zinc (Ho-Mg-Zn) quasicrystal are true regular pentagons.

The coccolithophore Braarudosphaera bigelowii, a unicellular coastal phytoplanktonic alga, can produce a calcium carbonate shell with a regular dodecahedral structure about 10 micrometers across.

The hydrocarbon dodecahedrane and quasicrystal such as holmium–magnesium–zinc quasicrystal have a dodecahedral shape (see figure). Some regular crystals, such as garnet and diamond are also said to exhibit "dodecahedral" habit, but this statement actually refers to the rhombic dodecahedron shape.

Various models have been proposed for the global geometry of the universe. These proposals include the Poincaré dodecahedral space, a positively curved space consisting of a regular dodecahedron whose opposite faces correspond (with a small twist). This was proposed by Jean-Pierre Luminet and colleagues in 2003, and an optimal orientation on the sky for the model was estimated in 2008.

== Dodecahedral graph ==
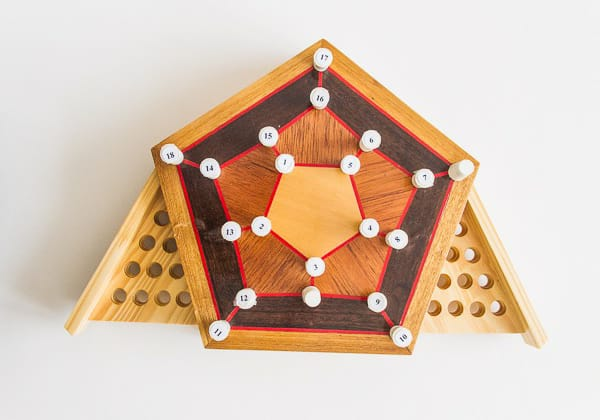
The dodecahedral graph's Hamiltonian property and the mathematical toy Icosian game

According to Steinitz's theorem, the graph can be represented as the skeleton of a polyhedron; roughly speaking, a framework of a polyhedron. Such a graph has two properties. It is planar, meaning the edges of a graph are connected to every vertex without crossing other edges. It is also three-connected graph: whenever a graph with more than three vertices and two of its vertices removed, the edges remain connected. The skeleton of a regular dodecahedron can be represented as a graph, and it is called the dodecahedral graph, a Platonic graph.

This graph can also be constructed as the generalized Petersen graph $G(10,2)$, where the vertices of a decagon are connected to those of two pentagons, one pentagon connected to odd vertices of the decagon and the other pentagon connected to the even vertices. Geometrically, this can be visualized as the ten-vertex equatorial belt of the dodecahedron connected to the two 5-vertex polar regions, one on each side.

The high degree of symmetry of the polygon is replicated in the properties of this graph, which are distance-transitive, distance-regular, and symmetric. The automorphism group has order a hundred and twenty. The vertices can be colored with 3 colors, as can the edges, and the diameter is five.

The dodecahedral graph is Hamiltonian, meaning a path visits all of its vertices exactly once. This property is named after William Rowan Hamilton, who invented a mathematical game known as the icosian game. The game's object was to find a Hamiltonian cycle along the edges of a dodecahedron.

== See also ==
- 120-cell, a regular polychoron (4D polytope whose surface consists of a hundred and twenty dodecahedral cells)
- Icosahedral twins - Nanoparticles which can have the shape of a regular dodecahedron.
- Law of constancy of interfacial angles
- Ramot Polin, where residents buildings are resembling regular dodecahedra
