= Colonel By Secondary School =

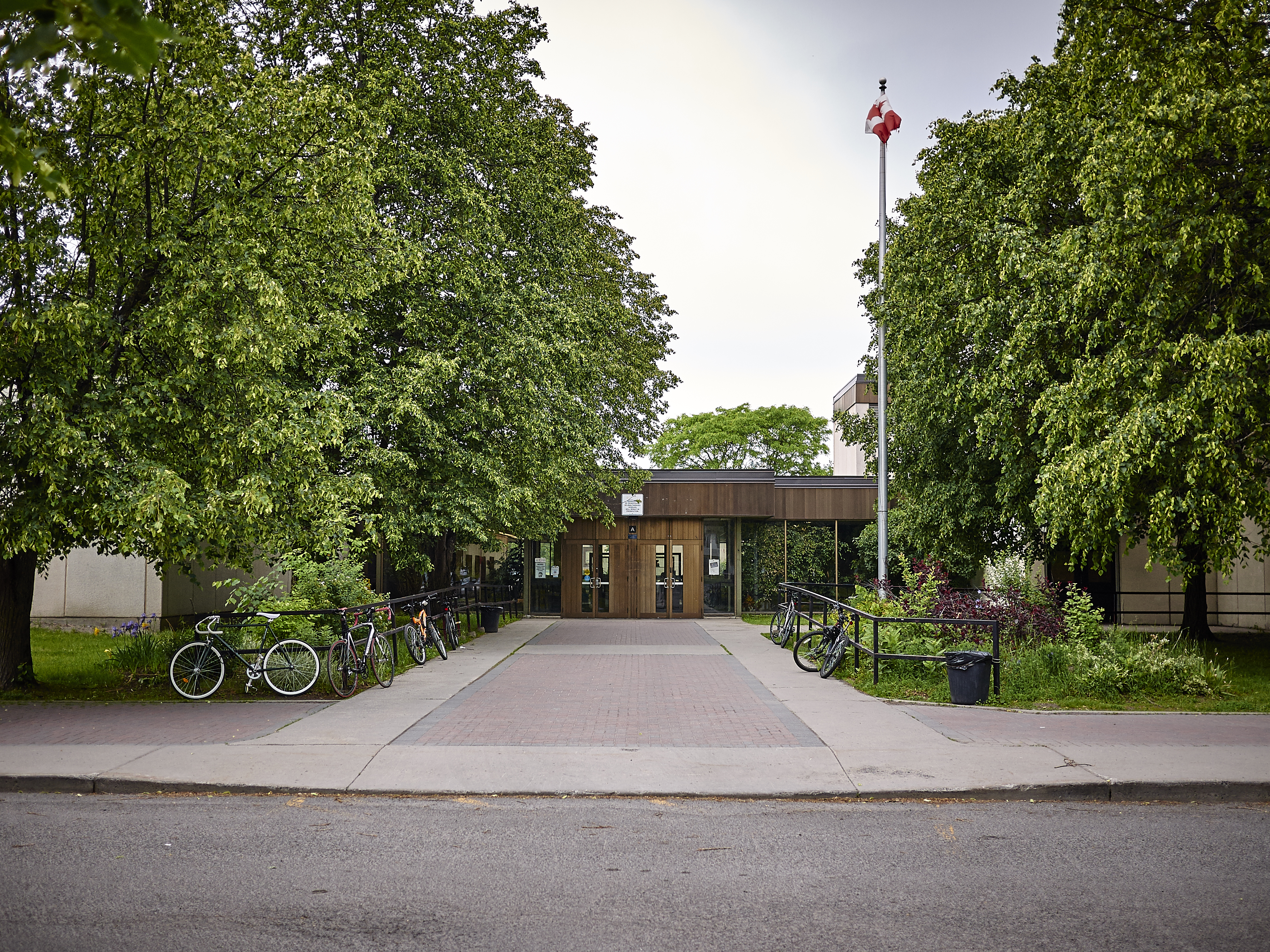

Location
- 2381 Ogilvie Road; Ottawa, Ontario, K1J 7N4; Canada; 45°27′18″N 75°36′00″W

Information
- School type: English public secondary
- Motto: Quod Incepimus Conficiemus (What We Have Begun, We Shall Finish)
- Founded: 1972
- School board: Ottawa Carleton District School Board
- Superintendent: Mary Jane Farrish
- Area trustee: Cathryne Lillian Milburn
- Principal: Trevor Grills
- IB Coordinator: Lewis Harthun, Jennifer Lee
- Grades: 9-12
- Enrollment: 1,164 (2019)
- Language: English, French, Spanish
- Campus type: Suburban
- Colours: Royal Blue & Kelly Green
- Mascot: Colby the Cougar
- Team name: Cougars
- Website: colonelbyss.ocdsb.ca

Colonel By Secondary School is a high school in the Beacon Hill neighbourhood of Ottawa, Ontario, Canada. It is a non-semestered school, and was the only English public school in Ottawa that offers the International Baccalaureate (IB) diploma programme until Merivale High School began its IB programme in September 2019. Colonel By has a reputation locally and provincially as an academically rigorous school. In the 2018–19 school year, it was ranked the sixth best secondary school in Ontario by the Fraser Institute.

== History ==
Colonel By Secondary School was unveiled on March 10, 1972. The school was designed by Craig and Kohler architects with P.E. Brule Co. Ltd. contractors. The school was erected by the Carleton Board of Education. The school is dedicated to Lieutenant-Colonel John By. J.L. McDonald served as the first principal of Colonel By Secondary School.

Colonel By Secondary School was named for Lieutenant Colonel John By, the Royal Engineers officer who supervised the building of Ottawa's Rideau Canal and 1826–1832 and founded Bytown. A historical plaque located on the grounds of Colonel By Secondary School states, "Colonel John By (1779–1836) was born and educated in England and first came to Canada in 1802. As a member of the Royal Engineers, he worked on the first small locks on the St. Lawrence River as well as the fortifications of Quebec. He returned to England in 1811 and fought in the peninsular War, but came back to Canada in 1826 to spend five summers heading the construction of the Rideau Canal, the 200 km long waterway which now connects Ottawa and Kingston. This formidable task included the building of about 50 dams and 47 locks, without the aid of modern equipment. But the amazing feat was never recognized in Colonel By's own lifetime, and he died three years after its completion, never imagining that many thousands of Canadians would greatly admire and value his achievement in the centuries to come. Colonel By's attributes of courage, determination, and diligence, inspire us to emulate him, in the hopes that we too may somehow serve our country in a way which will benefit future generations."

== Academics ==
=== International Baccalaureate Programme ===
Colonel By Secondary School offers the IB Diploma Programme, a pre-university course of studies offered to students over a two-year period from grade 11 to 12. Preparation for the challenge of the IB Diploma is begun in grade 9 and grade 10 through the enrichment and acceleration of various courses.

All successful recipients of the IB Diploma also receive their Ontario Secondary School Diploma.

=== Cougar Vision ===
Cougar Vision is a high school digital television station that provides coverage of school activities founded in 1999. It is Canada's first all‐digital high school television station, commercial‐free educational programming through "Cable in the Classroom".

=== Mathematics ===
Colonel By has had a history of strong math students who have performed well on national math contests administered by the University of Waterloo, as well as other local and national mathematics contests. For instance, in the 2009 Grade 9 Pascal's Math Contest, Colonel By came first in the city and fifth in Canada. However, its prominence in Olympiad mathematics has been more limited, with few outstanding results on the Canadian Open Mathematics Challenge that have warranted invitation to the Canadian Mathematical Olympiad.

This changed in the 2008–2009 school year with the arrival of freshman James Rickards. Despite his youth, he received an invitation to write the 2009 Canadian Mathematical Olympiad and scored in the 3rd division. His arrival coincided with the school registering for its first writing of the American Mathematics Competitions (a lobbying effort by the senior students at the time that was finally granted). Over half the students who wrote the AMC qualified for the American Invitational Mathematics Examination. James Rickards was the sole participant who went on to receive an invitation to write the United States of America Mathematical Olympiad.

In the 2009–2010 school year, James Rickards continued to represent Colonel By on the national scale as a sophomore. He placed 2nd in the 2010 Canadian Mathematical Olympiad, outperforming returning members of the 2009 Canadian International Mathematical Olympiad team. Surprisingly, the Canadian Mathematical Society did not invite James Rickards to the 2010 Canadian IMO team, making him the first student in over a decade to have placed 2nd on the CMO, but not to have been announced a member of the IMO team. Nonetheless, in 2012, James Rickards was announced as a member of the Canadian IMO team, making him the first Colonel By student in history to have received said honour.

=== Computer Science ===
Colonel By has produced students who have performed well on the national CCC, administered by the University of Waterloo. Notably, Zeyu Chen achieved a perfect 75/75 on the CCC Senior and was invited to the CCO in 2021, where he achieved a Silver medal. Zeyu Chen is also known for his performance on Advent of Code (AoC), in which he solidified places 43rd (2020) and 37th (2021) out of over 200 000 participants.

== Music and arts ==
=== Music ===
Colonel By is also home to the "C-Flats", Colonel By's award-winning vocal jazz ensemble. The ensemble won the gold award as well as 1st place standing in the vocal jazz category of the New York City Heritage Festival in 2014, and were invited to perform at Carnegie Hall. The C-Flats were also given the opportunity to perform at the National Day of Honour on Parliament Hill in May 2014.

Colonel By also has many award-winning jazz and concert bands that have performed and won awards at a variety of music festivals including the National Capital Region MusicFest and MusicFest Canada.

=== Theatre ===
Many students from Colonel By Secondary School participate in Canada's Capital Cappies, a theatrical club that involves putting together a play that is to be evaluated by several judges from across Ottawa. In 2012, Colonel By won the Cappies awards for Top Critic Team, Top Female Critic, Top Male Critic, and Featured Actor in a Play. In 2019, the school's production of Chicago (musical) won Cappie awards for Female Lead Actor in a Musical, Best Song, and Best Orchestra. In 2023, the Cappies team (Zoe Whitlock, Safya Khan, Calia Hare, Amelia Alam, Ishita Goswami and Samuel Khosla) was nominated for Best School. Safya Khan, Samuel Khosla, Zoe Whitlock and Amelia Alam were all also nominated for best Junior Critic.

== Athletics ==
Colonel By competed at OFSAA for a few ski and snowboarding events in the 2006/2007 season. In addition, the Colonel By Badminton team has done well in Junior and Senior events. The Colonel By Nordic Ski team has also done well in the past finishing 4th last year in Junior Combined and now looking for the NCSSAA championships for the Senior Boys. The Varsity Girls Water polo team is the two year running NCSSAA champions in 2007 and 2008 and placed second in 2006. The Colonel By rugby teams are known throughout the city, with the Varsity Girls' Team winning the NCSSAA championship in the 2011 season and placing among the top teams in previous years.

Soccer for Colonel By proved tone successful once again in 2015, as both the senior and junior girls teams were seen winning the championship in their tiers, tier 1 and tier 2, respectively.

=== Track and field ===
Colonel By is known for its recent surge of notable athletes in track and field. Four of Colonel By's athletes who competed in the 2007 OFSAA Track and Field Championships in Ottawa won medals (two gold, one silver and one bronze). Putting this into perspective, excluding this year, there has only been three athletes from eastern Ottawa from the past three years that have won medals in OFSAA.

One Colonel By's gold medalists in 2007, 15-year-old Oluwasegun Makinde, set a new junior provincial record in the men's 200m running a personal best of 21.74 seconds, demolishing the old record of 22.75. He attended the IAAF World Youth Championships in Athletics in the Czech Republic that summer. Footage of the record-breaking 200m finals can be seen here In his final year, Oluwasegun set the senior provincial record in the men's 200m running a personal best of 20.99 seconds. Footage of the record-breaking 200m finals can be seen here. He opted to not take a victory lap and went off to studies in university. Since then, he has had continued success, including the opportunity to run in the same relay race against Usain Bolt.

The track and field team has continued to progress and in 2010, it sent an Ottawa school board best 19 athletes and 5 relay teams to OFSAA.

=== Swimming ===
In 2008, Nathan Lam and Brian Chen tied for first place in the junior boys' 100-metre freestyle with a time of 58.48 seconds at the National Capital Secondary School Athletic Association swimming championships.

In 2011, Nathan Lam, Kashtin Patterson, Cody Lombardo and Brian Chen placed eighth in the senior boys' 4x50-metre freestyle relay at the Ontario Federal of School Athletic Association short-course swimming championships in Toronto.

== Clubs and fundraising ==
The Colonel By Open Eyes club hosts the Community Pancake Breakfast, an annual fundraising event in the community.

=== Reach for the Top and Quizbowl ===
The Colonel By Reach for the Top team won provincials in 2001, and has attended Reach for the Top and Quiz Bowl events consistently. The Reach for the Top team at Colonel By participated in provincials in 2014, coming in the top ten. Colonel By's Quiz Bowl team has also consistently achieved success, winning the 2013-2014 and 2014-2015 Quiz Bowl Provincial Championships. The team also tied for 21st at the 2015 High School National Championship Tournament.

== Notable alumni ==
- Bryan Adams, musician
- Fedor Andreev, figure skater
- Ryan Bell, basketball player
- Patrick Biggs, alpine skier
- Svitlana Demchenko, chess player
- Ajay Fry, television personality
- Tom Green, Comedian, actor, television personality
- Rene Konga, NFL defensive tackle
- Amber MacArthur, television personality.
- Anne-Marie MacDonald, author, television host
- Vanessa Morgan, actress
- John Morris, curler
- Deborah Raji, computer scientist, activist
- Joel A. Sutherland, author
- Isabelle Weidemann, speed skater
- Qiyu Zhou, chess player, Internet personality

== See also ==
- Education in Ontario
- List of secondary schools in Ontario
