= Ralph Duncan James =

Canadian mathematician (1909–1979)

Ralph Duncan James (8 February 1909 – 19 May 1979) was a Canadian mathematician working on number theory and mathematical analysis.

Born in Liverpool, England, James moved with his parents to Vancouver, British Columbia when he was 10 years old. After graduating from high school, James attended University of British Columbia. After graduating, he continued in mathematics, writing a master’s thesis on Tangential Coordinates. Proceeding to University of Chicago, he studied number theory and Waring's problem under L. E. Dickson. In 1932 he was a awarded a Ph.D. on the strength of his dissertation Analytical Investigations of Waring's Theorem. He continued post-graduate study, first with E. T. Bell at California Institute of Technology, then in 1934 with G. H. Hardy at Cambridge University. He published in the Transactions of the American Mathematical Society and extended some work of Viggo Brun in 1938.

James was a professor of mathematics at University of California, Berkeley from 1934 to 1939. He was then called to University of Saskatchewan where he became head of the mathematics department. In 1943 he began his long tenure at University of British Columbia, becoming head of the department in 1948. James made contributions to the theory of the Perron integral and to solution of Goldbach's conjecture.

When the International Congress of Mathematicians convened in Vancouver in 1974, the four volumes of the Proceedings of the congress were edited by Ralph D. James.

He died on 19 May 1979 on Salt Spring Island in British Columbia.

Since 1978, the Canadian Mathematical Society have awarded the Coxeter–James Prize in his honor.

== Papers ==
Ralph Duncan James published the following papers in the course of his career:

- 1934: Mathematische Annalen "On the representation of integers as sums of pyramidal numbers"
- 1934: Transactions of the American Mathematical Society 36(2):395–444 "The value of the number g(k) in Waring's problem" MR1501751
- 1938: Transactions of the American Mathematical Society 43(2):296–302 "A problem in additive number theory" MR1501944
- 1939: Duke Mathematical Journal 5:948–62 "Integers which are not represented by certain ternary quadratic forms" MR0001230
- 1942: (with Hermann Weyl ) American Journal of Mathematics 64:539–52 "Elementary note on prime number problems of Vinogradoff’s type" MR0006745
- 1943: Bulletin of the American Mathematical Society 49:422–32 "On the sieve method of Viggo Brun" MR0008229
- 1946: (with Walter Gage ) Transactions of the Royal Society of Canada Section III(3) 40:25–35 "A generalized integral" MR0021081
- 1949: Bulletin of the AMS 55:246–60 "Recent progress on the Goldbach problem" MR0028893
- 1950: Canadian Journal of Mathematics 2:297–306 "A generalized integral II" MR0036344
- 1954: (with Ivan Niven) Proceedings of the American Mathematical Society 5:834–8 "Unique factorization in multiplicative systems" MR0060002
- 1955: Bulletin of the AMS 61:1–15 "Integrals and summable trigonometric series" MR0067228
- 1956: Pacific Journal of Mathematics 6:99–110 "Summable trigonometric series" MR0078474
- 1968: Canadian Mathematical Bulletin 11:733–5 "The factors of a square-free integer" MR0240038
- 1970: American Mathematical Monthly 77(1):94 "Review: Studies in Number Theory"
