= Denis-Constant Martin =

French scholar (born 1947)

Denis-Constant Martin (born 13 July 1947) is a French scholar.

== Biography ==
Martin, a graduate of the Institut d'études politiques de Paris and the Institut national des langues et civilisations orientales, is the holder of two doctorates, directed by Georges Balandier. From 1969 to 2008, he was research director at the Centre de recherches internationales. A researcher at the "Centre d'étude d'Afrique noire" of the Bordeaux University, he teaches political anthropology at the Institut d'études politiques de Bordeaux and has also given courses in the music department of the Paris 8 University, but also, among others, in South Africa, Algeria, the United States and Kenya where in 1980 he founded and directed the "Institut de recherches en Afrique."

== Fields of research ==
Martin's work is mainly focused on two areas: Political sociology and Political anthropology, notably in Africa, and popular sociomusicology.

== Publications ==
- Aux sources du Reggae. Musique, société et politique en Jamaïque, éd. Parenthèses, 1982.
- Le Kenya, with Marie-Christine Martin, Que sais-je ?, 1983.
- L'Héritage de Kenyatta, L'Harmattan, 1985.
- Tanzanie, l'invention d'une culture politique, Fondation nationale des sciences politiques, 1988.
- Constellation, satellites, systèmes : enjeux régionaux, enjeux continentaux en Afrique Australe, Centre d'études d'Afrique noire, 1989.
- L'Amérique de Mingus, with Didier Levallet, Éditions P.O.L, 1991.
- La découverte des cultures politiques : esquisse d'une approche comparatiste à partir des expériences africaines, Centre de recherches internationales, 1992.
- Les démocraties antillaises en crise, Éditions Karthala, 199
- Le gospel afro-américain : des spirituals au rap religieux, Actes Sud, 1998.
- Coon Carnival, New Year in Cape Town, Past and Present, David Philip Publishers, 1999.
- La France du jazz : musique, modernité et identité dans la première moitié du XXe siècle, éd. Parenthèses, 2002.
- Viewing the New South Africa, Representations of South Africa in Television Commercials, Institut français d'Afrique du Sud, 2006.
- Quand le rap sort de sa bulle. Sociologie politique d'un succès populaire (about Diam's), Éditions Mélanie Seteun / IRMA, 2010.

=== Direction of studies ===
- Les Afriques politiques, with Christian Coulon, La Découverte publisher, 1991.
- Sortir de l'apartheid, Éditions Complexe, 1992.
- Cartes d'identité, comment dit-on « nous » en politique ?, Fondation nationale des sciences politiques, 1994.
- Les nouveaux langages du politique en Afrique orientale, éditions Karthala, 1998.
- Sur la piste des OPNI (Objets politiques non identifiés), éd. Karthala, 2002.
- L'identité en jeux, pouvoirs, identifications, mobilisations, Karthala/Ceri, 2010.
