= Kellerhals =

Kellerhals is a surname. Notable people with the surname include:

- Erich Kellerhals (1939–2017), German billionaire businessman
- Ruth Kellerhals (born 1957), Swiss mathematician
