= Metabiaugmented dodecahedron =

60th Johnson solid (20 faces)

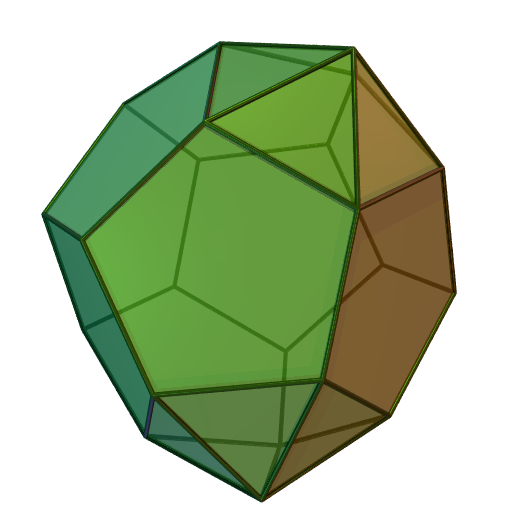
- Type: Johnson; J_{59} – J_{60} – J_{61}
- Faces: 2+2×4 triangles 3×2+4 pentagons
- Edges: 40
- Vertices: 22
- Vertex configuration: 3.2+4(5^{3}); 2+2.4(3^{2}.5^{2}); 2(3^{5})
- Symmetry group: C_{2v}
- Dual polyhedron: -
- Properties: convex

Net
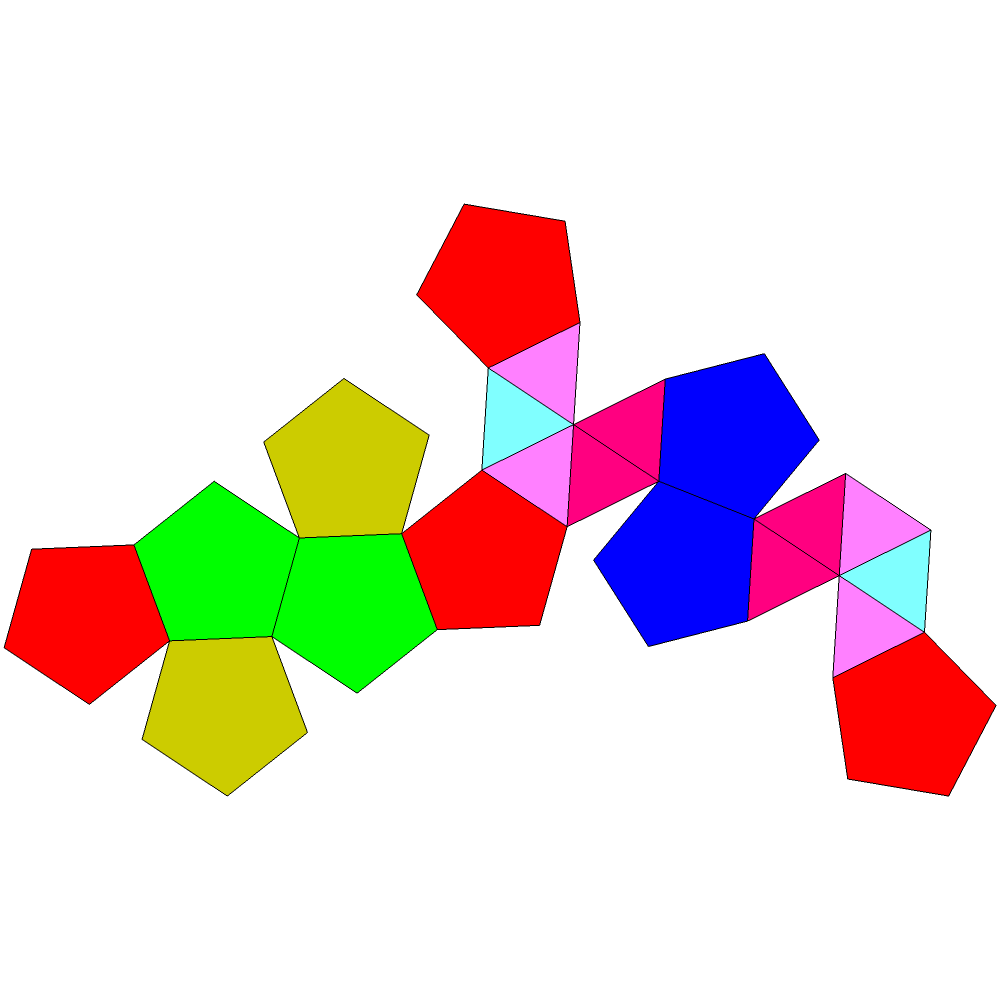

In geometry, the metabiaugmented dodecahedron is one of the Johnson solids (J_{60}). It can be viewed as a dodecahedron with two pentagonal pyramids (J_{2}) attached to two faces that are separated by one face. (The two faces are not opposite, but not adjacent either.) When pyramids are attached to a dodecahedron in other ways, they may result in an augmented dodecahedron (J_{58}), a parabiaugmented dodecahedron (J_{59}), a triaugmented dodecahedron (J_{61}), or even a pentakis dodecahedron if the faces are made to be irregular.

A Johnson solid is one of 92 strictly convex polyhedra that are composed of regular polygon faces but are not uniform polyhedra (that is, they are not Platonic solids, Archimedean solids, prisms, or antiprisms). They were named by Norman Johnson, who first listed these polyhedra in 1966.

3D model of a metabiaugmented dodecahedron
