= Mireille Capitaine =

French mathematician

Mireille Capitaine is a French mathematician whose research focuses on random matrices and free probability theory. In 2012 she was a recipient of the G. de B. Robinson Award for a paper she coauthored that introduced free Bessel laws, a two-parameter family of generalizations of the free Poisson distribution. She received her PhD in 1996 from Paul Sabatier University, where she was advised by Michel Ledoux. She is currently a researcher for the French National Centre for Scientific Research (CNRS), associated with the Toulouse Institute of Mathematics.
