= Eddy Campbell =

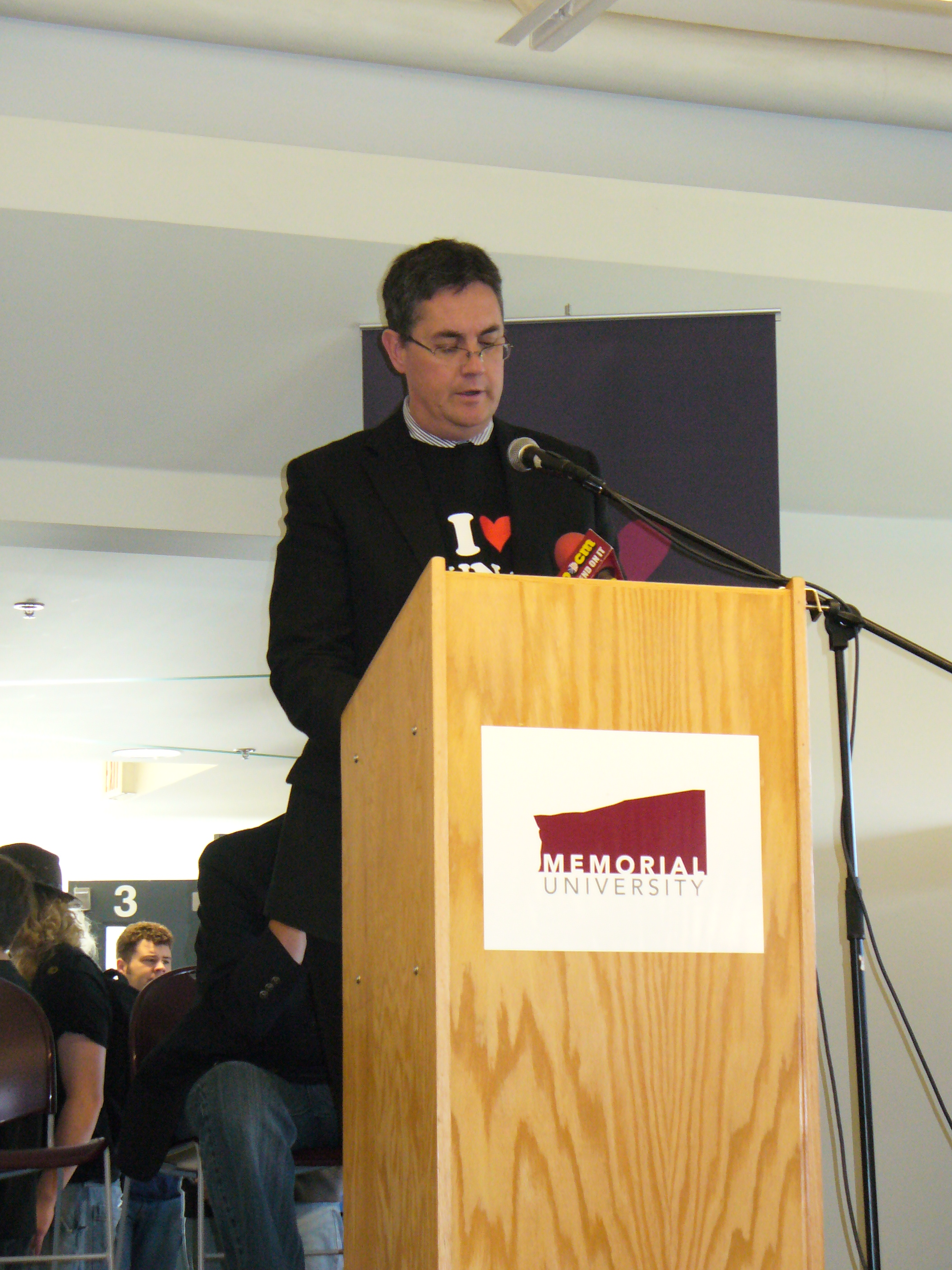
Campbell speaking at Memorial University of Newfoundland for the opening of "I Love MUNdays" in 2007.

Eddy Campbell is a Canadian mathematician, university professor, and university administrator. He served as the president of the University of New Brunswick from 2009 - 2019.

H. E. A. (Eddy) Campbell earned two degrees in mathematics from Memorial University of Newfoundland, and completed his doctorate at the University of Toronto. He did post-doctoral work at the University of Western Ontario. In 1983, he joined the Department of Mathematics and Statistics at Queen's University in Kingston, Ontario, eventually rising to head of that department. His main research interest is the invariant theory of finite groups. Campbell then served as Associate Dean of the Faculty of Arts and Science at Queen's. He served as president of the Canadian Mathematical Society from 2004 to 2006.

Campbell returned to his original alma mater in May 2004, to become a Vice-president, Academic at Memorial. Upon the resignation of President Alex Meisen, he then stepped into the role of president (pro tempore) and vice-chancellor on January 1, 2008.

Campbell applied for the permanent position with wide support within the MUN community, and was shortlisted by the Search Committee. However, in late July 2008, Minister of Education Joan Burke, who was not part of the selection process, stated after an interview with two shortlisted candidates that neither was acceptable to her. This was widely criticized as political interference in the autonomy of the University. Campbell immediately withdrew his name from consideration, and the Chair of Memorial's Board of Trustees, Gil Dalton, also withdrew as leader of the search committee in September 2008. Campbell remained in his position until September 2009, when he accepted the position of President of the University of New Brunswick. In January 2014, he took part in negotiations to end the first strike of academic staff in UNB's 225-plus years history. He later approved compensation to UNB students. The labour dispute was resolved by arbitration.

In 2018 the Canadian Mathematical Society listed him in their inaugural class of fellows.

Academic offices
Preceded by Axel Meisen	President of Memorial University of Newfoundland; 2008–2009	Succeeded by Chris Loomis
Academic offices
Preceded by John McLaughlin	President of University of New Brunswick; 2009–2020	Succeeded by Paul Mazerolle
