= Cairn.info =

Web portal for scientific publications in French

- History: 2005-present
- Languages: French, English, Spanish

Coverage
- Disciplines: Subscription
- Record depth: Index, abstract & full-text
- Format coverage: Journal articles and books
- Geospatial coverage: French-speaking world

Links
- Website: cairn.info

Cairn.info is a French-language web portal, founded in 2005, containing scholarly materials in the humanities and social sciences and recently scientific, technical, and medical sciences. Much of the collection is in French, but it also includes an English-language international interface to facilitate use by non-francophones. Primary research areas include communications, economics, education, geography, history, literature, linguistics, philosophy, political science, law, psychology, sociology, and cultural studies. The site provides gratis open access to some publications.

The site originated with materials from four major French and Belgian publishing houses: Éditions Belin, De Boeck, La Découverte and Éditions Érès. Bibliothèque nationale de France joined in 2006, followed by Presses universitaires de France (PUF) in 2014 and the Groupe Madrigall (Gallimard, Flammarion) in 2020. It has since expanded to include publications from multiple other publishers, including extensive collections of French-language journals – 150,000 journal articles and 4000 books.

== Titles ==
The following list includes some examples of journals in Cairn.info:

- A contrario
- Actes de la recherche en sciences sociales
- Actuel Marx
- Adolescence
- Afrique & Histoire
- Afrique contemporaine
- Agora débats/jeunesses
- Annales de démographie historique
- Annales de géographie
- Annales. Histoire, Sciences Sociales
- L'Année balzacienne
- L'Année psychanalytique internationale
- L'Année sociologique
- Archives d'histoire doctrinale et littéraire du Moyen Âge
- Archives de philosophie
- Archives de sciences sociales des religions
- L'autre
- Autrepart
- Bulletin de psychologie
- Cahiers critiques de thérapie familiale et de pratiques de réseaux
- Cahiers d'études africaines
- Les Cahiers de l'Orient
- Cahiers de psychologie clinique
- Cahiers du genre
- Cahiers du monde russe
- Cahiers internationaux de psychologie soiale
- Cahiers philosophiques
- Le Carnet Psy
- Carrefours de l'éducation
- Champ psy
- Chimères
- Cités
- La Clinique lacanienne
- Cliniques méditerranéennes
- Clio. Femmes, genre, histoire
- Communications
- Comptabilité-contrôle-audit
- Confluences Méditerranée
- Connexions
- Le Coq-Héron
- Critique
- Critique internationale
- Le Débat
- Devenir
- Déviance et société
- Dialogue
- Diogène
- Distances et savoirs
- Dix-huitième siècle
- Dix-septième siècle
- Document numérique
- Documentaliste - Sciences de l'information
- Droit et société
- Économie et prévision
- Économie internationale
- L'Économie politique
- Économie rurale
- Éducation et sociétés
- Éla
- Enfances et psy
- L'En-je lacanien
- Entreprises et histoire
- L'Espace géographique
- Espaces et sociétés
- Esprit
- Ethnologie française
- Études économiques de l'OCDE
- Les Études philosophiques
- Étvdes
- Études rurales
- L'Expansion Management Review
- Flux
- Formation emploi
- Genèses
- Gestion
- Géographie, économie, société
- Gradhiva
- Hérodote
- Histoire et sociétés rurales
- Histoire de l'éducation
- L'Homme
- L'Homme et la Société
- Idées économiques et sociales
- Imaginaire et inconscient
- Innovations
- Journal français de psychiatrie
- Journal de la psychanalyse de l'enfant
- Journal des psychologues
- Journal international de bioéthique
- Langage et société
- Langue française
- La Lettre de l'enfance et de l'adolescence
- Littératures classiques
- Management & Avenir
- M@n@gement
- Mil neuf cent. Revue d'histoire intellectuelle
- Médiologie|Médium / Cahiers de médiologie
- Mondes en développement
- Mouvements
- Mots. Les langages du politique
- Le Mouvement social
- Le Moyen Âge
- Multitudes
- Natures Sciences Sociétés
- Négociations
- Nouvelle revue de psychosociologie
- Outre-Terre
- Parlement(s): Revue d'histoire politique
- Participations
- Pensée plurielle
- Perspectives économiques de l'OCDE
- Philosophia Scientiæ
- Philosophie
- Poétique
- Politique africaine
- Politique américaine
- Politique étrangère
- Politique européenne
- Politix. Revue des sciences sociales du politique
- Population
- Pouvoirs
- Psychanalyse
- Psychologie clinique et projective
- Présence africaine
- Projet
- La Psychiatrie de l'enfant
- Psychothérapies
- Psychotropes
- Quaderni
- Raisons politiques
- Recherches de science religieuse
- Reflets et perspectives de la vie économique
- Réformes économiques
- Regards croisés sur l'économie
- Réseaux
- Retraite et société
- Revue archéologique
- Revue congolaise de gestion
- Revue d'anthropologie des connaissances
- Revue d'assyriologie et d'archéologie orientale
- Revue d'économie du développement
- Revue d'économie industrielle
- Revue d'économie politique
- Revue d'économie régionale et urbaine
- Revue d'éthique et de théologie morale
- Revue de littérature comparée
- Revue de l'OFCE
- Revue de métaphysique et de morale
- Revue de philologie, de littérature et d'histoire anciennes
- Revue de psychothérapie psychanalytique de groupe
- Revue de l'histoire des religions
- Revue d'histoire moderne et contemporaine
- Revue d'histoire des sciences
- Revue d'histoire des sciences humaines
- Revue d'histoire littéraire de la France
- Revue de neuropsychologie
- Revue des sciences de gestion
- Revue du MAUSS
- Revue économique
- Revue économique de l'OCDE
- Revue européenne des migrations internationales
- Revue française d'administration publique
- Revue française des affaires sociales
- Revue française d'études américaines
- Revue française de gestion
- Revue française d'histoire des idées politiques
- Revue française de linguistique appliquée
- Revue française de pédagogie
- Revue française de psychanalyse
- Revue française de psychosomatique
- Revue française de science politique
- Revue française de socio-économie
- Revue française de sociologie
- Revue internationale de droit économique
- Revue internationale de philosophie
- Revue internationale de politique comparée
- Revue internationale de psychologie sociale
- Revue internationale de psychosociologie
- Revue internationale des sciences sociales
- Revue internationale et stratégique
- Revue philosophique
- Revue Tiers Monde
- Rue Descartes
- Santé publique
- Savoirs et clinique
- Science et motricité
- Sciences du Design
- Sciences Sociales et Santé
- Sciences sociales et sport
- Sève : Les Tribunes de la santé
- Sociétés
- Sociétés contemporaines
- Sociologie
- Sociologies pratiques
- Spirale : La Grande Aventure de monsieur Bébé
- Staps
- Sud/Nord : Folies et cultures
- Le Temps des médias
- Terrain
- Terrains et travaux
- Thérapie familiale
- Topique
- Tracés
- Transversalités
- Le Travail humain
- Travailler
- Travaux de linguistique
- Vie sociale et traitements
- Vingtième siècle : Revue d'histoire
- Volume ! La Revue des musiques populaires
