= Javad Mashreghi =

Canadian mathematician

- Born: 1968 (age 57–58); Kashan, Iran
- Education: University of Tehran, McGill University
- Scientific career
- Fields: Mathematics
- Workplaces: Université Laval

Javad Mashreghi is a mathematician and author working in function space theory, functional analysis and complex analysis. He is a professeur titulaire at Université Laval and was the 35th and 39th President of the Canadian Mathematical Society (2020–2022, 2026-208).

== Early life and education ==
Mashreghi was born in Kashan, Iran, in 1968. He studied electrical engineering, electronics, (B.Sc., 1991), and pure mathematics (M.Sc., 1993) at the University of Tehran. He moved to Canada in 1996 and earned his Ph.D. from the McGill University in 2001. Since then he lives in the Province of Quebec.

== Service to Canadian mathematical community ==
Mashreghi is immensely involved in various aspects of North America's mathematical community, having served on numerous editorial, administrative and selection committees all across Canada and the U.S. (CMS, AMS, Fields Institute, CRM, AARMS, NSERC, FQRNT, NSF). He was the 35th President of the Canadian Mathematical Society (2020–2022), and is currently the editor-in-chief of the Canadian Mathematical Bulletin (2020–2025) and Concrete Operators (2018–2025).

== Honours and awards ==
- Prix Summa, Research Award, Université Laval, 2025.
- Giovanni Prodi Chair, University of Würzburg, Germany, 2024-2025.
- Béla Szőkefalvi-Nagy Medal, Bolyai Institute, Hungary, 2024.
- Canada Research Chair in Function Spaces, Laval University, Canada, 2023-2030.
- Fellow of the American Mathematical Society in the 2024 class of fellows.
- Fulbright Research Chair in Signal Processing, Vanderbilt University, USA, 2023-2024.
- Fellow of the Fields Institute, 2023.
- IEEE Prize Paper Award, 2021.
- Fellow of the Canadian Mathematical Society, 2019.
- Khwarizmi International Award, Research Prize of IROST, 2009, declined.
- G. de B. Robinson Award, Canadian Mathematical Society, 2004.
- Professeur Étoile, Annual Excellence in Teaching Award, Laval University, eight academic years.

== Bibliography ==
=== Books ===
- S. Garcia, J. Mashreghi, W. Ross, Operator Theory by Example, Oxford University Press, 2023.
- R. Cheng, J. Mashreghi, W. Ross, Function Theory and lp Spaces, AMS University Lecture Series, 2020.
- S. Garcia, J. Mashreghi, W. Ross, Finite Blaschke Products and their Connections, Springer Monograph Series, Springer, 2018.
- S. Garcia, J. Mashreghi, W. Ross, Introduction to Model Spaces and their Operators, Cambridge Studies in Advanced Mathematics 148, Cambridge University Press, 2016.
- E. Fricain, J. Mashreghi, Theory of H(b) Spaces, Volume II, New Monographs in Mathematics 21, Cambridge University Press, 2016.
- E. Fricain, J. Mashreghi, Theory of H(b) Spaces, Volume I, New Monographs in Mathematics 20, Cambridge University Press, 2016.
- O. El-Fallah, K. Kellay, J. Mashreghi, T. Ransford, A Primer on the Dirichlet Space, Cambridge Tracts in Mathematics 203, Cambridge University Press, Cambridge, 2014.
- J. Mashreghi, Derivatives of Inner Functions, Fields Institute Monographs 31, 2013.
- J. Mashreghi, Representation Theorems in Hardy Spaces, London Mathematical Society Student Text Series 74, Cambridge University Press, Cambridge, 2009.
- J. Mashreghi, Structures algébriques, Loze-Dion éditeur inc., 2007.
- J. Mashreghi, Analyse abstraite, Loze-Dion éditeur inc., 2006.

=== Conference proceedings ===
- G. Dales, D. Khavinson, J. Mashreghi, Complex Analysis and Spectral Theory, Contemporary Mathematics 743, 2020.
- A. Bourhim, J. Mashreghi, L. Oubbi, Z. Abdelali, Linear and Multilinear Algebra and Function Spaces, Contemporary Mathematics 750, 2020.
- A. Aldroubi, L. A. Caudillo-Mata, J. Chung, P. Gonzalez Casanova, J. Mashreghi, Harmonic Analysis and Inverse Problems, Sampling Theory in Signal and Image Processing, 2018.
- J. Mashreghi, G. Prajitura, R. Zhao, The First Northeastern Analysis Meeting, The Theta Foundation, 2018.
- M. Manolaki, J. Mashreghi, P. Gauthier, New Trends in approximation Theory, Fields Institute Communications 81, 2018.
- E. Fricain, J. Mashreghi, W. Ross, Invariant Subspaces of the Shift Operator, Contemporary Mathematics 638, 2015.
- E. Fricain, J. Mashreghi, Blaschke products and Their Applications, Fields Institute Communications 65, 2013.
- A. Boivin, J. Mashreghi, Complex Analysis and Potential Theory, CRM Proceedings & Lecture Notes 55, 2012.
- J. Mashreghi, T. Ransford, K. Seip, Hilbert Spaces of Analytic Functions, CRM Proceedings & Lecture Notes 51, 2010.

=== Selected articles ===
- R. Cheng, J. Mashreghi, W. Ross, Inner functions and zero sets for LpA, Trans. Amer. Math. Soc., 372(3):2045-2072, 2019.
- J. Mashreghi, T. Ransford, A Gleason-Kahane-Zelazko theorem for modules and applications to holomorphic function spaces, Bull. Lond. Math. Soc., 47 (6):1014-1020, 2015.
- B. Aaranov, I. Chalendar, E. Fricain, J. Mashreghi, D. Timotin, Bounded symbols and reproducing kernel thesis for truncated Toeplitz operators, J. Funct. Anal., 259(10):2673-2701,2010.
- B. Aaranov, E. Fricain, J. Mashreghi, Weighted norm inequalities for de Branges–Rovnyak spaces and their applications, Amer. J. Math., 132(1):125-155, 2010.
- V. Havin, J. Mashreghi, Admissible majorants for model subspaces of H2(R), Part I & II, Canad. J. Math., 55(6): 1231-1263 & 1264–1301, 2003.
