= Paul Mazerolle =

Canadian educator and university administrator

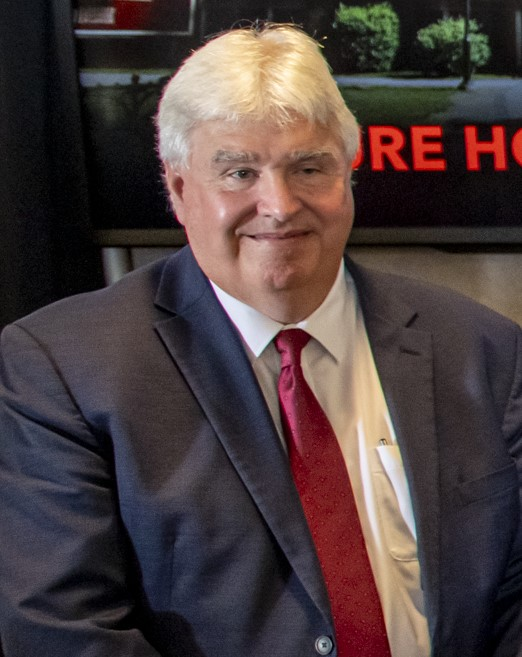
- Mazerolle in 2023

19th President of the University of New Brunswick
- In office 2019 – March 13, 2026
- Preceded by: Eddy Campbell
- Succeeded by: Kathy Wilson (acting)

Personal details
- Born: Paul J. Mazerolle Fredericton, New Brunswick, Canada
- Education: University of New Brunswick (B.A., 1989); Northeastern University (M.S., 1990); University of Maryland (PhD, 1995)
- Organizations: University of Cincinnati Department of Criminal Justice; Crime and Misconduct Commission; Griffith University Violence Research and Prevention Program

Paul Mazerolle (born 1964 or 1965) is a Canadian criminologist and university administrator. Born in Fredericton, New Brunswick, he served as the president and vice-chancellor of the University of New Brunswick, and has previously served as an administrator at Griffith University in Queensland, Australia. Mazerolle has also been an assistant professor at the University of Cincinnati's Department of Criminal Justice.

== Early life and career ==
Mazerolle was born in Fredericton, New Brunswick, to parents Kay and Rowan Mazerolle. In 1984, at the age of 19, he was a competitive hockey player and goaltender for the Northside Pizza Delight Caps in the Southern New Brunswick Junior Hockey League, while studying at the University of New Brunswick. Previously, he left as a hockey player for St. Thomas University. In 1989, Mazerolle received his Bachelor of Arts in sociology at the University of New Brunswick. The following year, he studied in the United States where he earned a Master of Science in criminal justice at Northeastern University, and in 1995 he earned his PhD in criminology at the University of Maryland. At the time of receiving his PhD, he was an assistant professor at the University of Cincinnati's Department of Criminal Justice.

== Career ==
In 2000, Mazerolle moved to Australia and worked at the University of Queensland. Between 2002 and 2005, he served as the first Research and Prevention Director for the Crime and Misconduct Commission. In 2006, he became a professor and director of the Violence Research and Prevention Program at Griffith University, where he would later serve as the head of the Key Centre for Ethics, Law, Justice and Governance. Mazerolle has also been an editor of the Australian and New Zealand Journal of Criminology.

In 2019, Mazerolle moved back to New Brunswick, Canada where he became the president and vice-chancellor of the University of New Brunswick (UNB). In 2023, he was reappointed to serve at the University of New Brunswick for an additional five year term, which began on July 1, 2024. On October 16, 2025, UNB announced Mazerolle's decision to step down after the spring 2026 term. The following day, it was announced that he would be serving as Vice Chancellor of University of Southern Queensland in March 2026.

== Publications ==
- Piquero, Alex & Mazerolle, Paul. (2000). Life-Course Criminology: Contemporary and Classic Readings.
- Mazerolle, Paul, and Tara Renae McGee. (2015). Developmental and Life-Course Criminological Theories.
- Piquero, Alexis Russell, and Paul J. Mazerolle, editors. Criminal Career Findings and Life-Course Studies: Worldwide Research and Perspectives.
