= Parabiaugmented dodecahedron =

59th Johnson solid (20 faces)

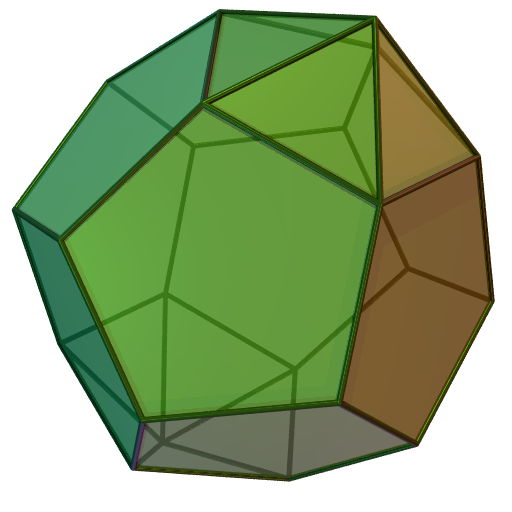
- Type: Johnson; J_{58} – J_{59} – J_{60}
- Faces: 10 triangles 10 pentagons
- Edges: 40
- Vertices: 22
- Vertex configuration: 10(5^{3}); 10(3^{2}.5^{2}); 2(3^{5})
- Symmetry group: D_{5d}
- Properties: convex

Net
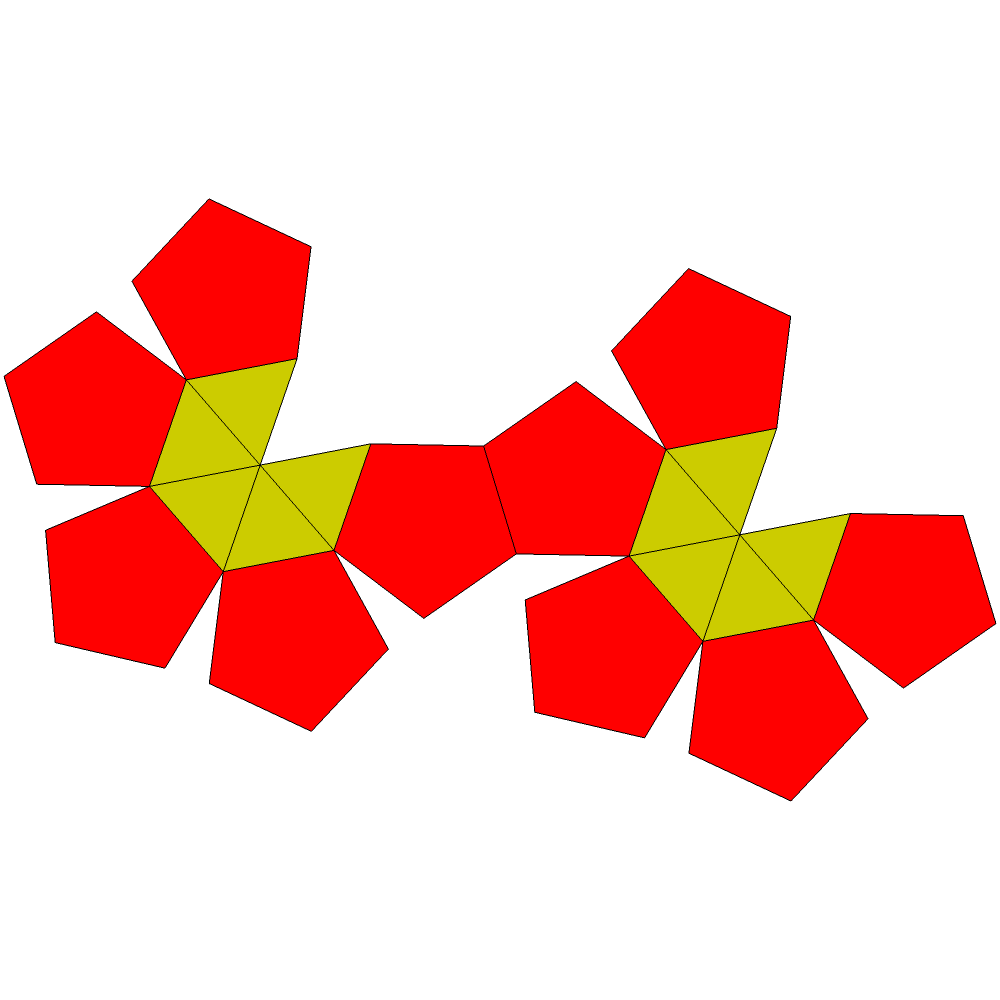

In geometry, the parabiaugmented dodecahedron is one of the Johnson solids (J_{59}). It can be seen as a dodecahedron with two pentagonal pyramids (J_{2}) attached to opposite faces. When pyramids are attached to a dodecahedron in other ways, they may result in an augmented dodecahedron (J_{58}), a metabiaugmented dodecahedron (J_{60}), a triaugmented dodecahedron (J_{61}), or even a pentakis dodecahedron if the faces are made to be irregular.

A Johnson solid is one of 92 strictly convex polyhedra that are composed of regular polygon faces but are not uniform polyhedra (that is, they are not Platonic solids, Archimedean solids, prisms, or antiprisms). They were named by Norman Johnson, who first listed these polyhedra in 1966.

3D model of a parabiaugmented dodecahedron
