= Éditions Mélanie Seteun =

French publisher

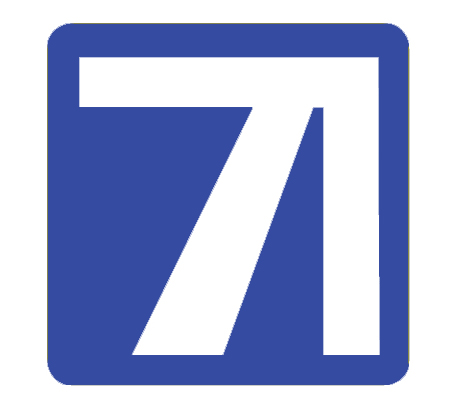
- Status: Association
- Founded: 1998
- Founder: Samuel Étienne & Gérôme Guibert
- Country of origin: France
- Headquarters location: Guichen
- Distribution: Les presses du réel
- Publication types: Volume!, "Musique et Société" collection
- Nonfiction topics: popular music studies publications & events
- Owner: Association Mélanie Seteun
- Official website: journals.openedition.org/volume/

The Éditions Mélanie Seteun are a publishing association dedicated to "taking popular music seriously, especially within the French-speaking world. They publish Volume! the French Journal of Popular Music Studies, book collections ("Musique et Société", "Musique et environnement professionnel"), and participate in several activities promoting their field of study in France.

== Publications ==
=== Book collections ===
The Éditions Mélanie Seteun started their activities by creating the "Music et Société" collection of books dealing with popular music, as well as one others (politics with the "Rock & Politics" collection, and more recently, popular music and institutions with the "Musique et Environnement professionnel" collection).

=== Volume ! the French Journal of Popular Music Studies ===
The founders, Gérôme Guibert and Samuel Étienne, founded Volume! in 2002 with Marie-Pierre Bonniol, to create an academic space for popular music studies. The journal has published, as of 2017, 29 issues, on themes such as countercultures, black music, postcolonialism, the alternative music press.

Volume! has been online since 2013, on French-speaking portals Revues.org and Cairn.info, as well as on RILM Abstracts with Full Text since 2016.

=== Vibrations. Musiques, médias, société ===
The Éditions Mélanie Seteun have directed the electronic publication of the first French popular music studies journal Vibrations. Musiques, médias, société, created by Antoine Hennion, Jean-Rémy Julien and Jean-Claude Klein in the mid-1980s, on the French academic portal Persée.

=== Ashgate partnership ===
It also published a special international, English edition of its "countercultures" issues with Ashgate Publishing, a partnership with the Éditions Mélanie Seteun that had already taken place for the publication of the book Stereo: Comparative Perspectives on the Sociological Study of Popular Music in France and Britain.

== Events ==
=== Conferences ===
It has co-organized many conferences, including:

- "What is it we call "Black music"?" in Bordeaux, 2010;
- In November 2012, it participated in the conference on "Digital Publishing in the Humanities. Perspectives from France and Canada" organized by the French Consulate in Toronto, the French Institute, the University of Toronto, and York University;
- "Changing the Tune. Popular music and politics in the XXIst century" international conference in Strasbourg in 2013; with the German association ASPM and the French branch of the IASPM.;
- "Heavy metal et sciences sociales : un état des lieux de la recherche francophone" in Angers (December 2014),;
- "Rock and violences in Europe (1955-1990)", in 2017;
- "Conçues pour durer. Perspectives francophones sur les musiques hip-hop" in 2017.

=== Partnerships with institutions ===
It organizes events (conferences, concerts) with various institutions, such as the Musée du Quai Branly, the Centre Georges Pompidou public library, the Cité de la Musique, the Philharmonie de Paris, La Gaîté Lyrique, the Collège International de Philosophie, or the Centre Musical Fleury Goutte d'Or-Barbara, as well as with record labels/festivals, such as the festival "F.A.M.E. Film Music & Experience" in March 2014, or in May 2012, the "Humanist Records Festival #3" and venues, such as the Point Éphémère.

The "Great Black Music" exhibit at the Cité de la Musique in Paris was co-curated by journalist Marc Benaïche and ethnomusicologist Emmanuel Parent. The latter, a member of the journal's team since 2004, had co-organized the 2010 "What is it we call Black Music?" (Peut-on parler de musique noire ?) conference in Bordeaux whose proceedings were published in Volume! (n°8-1, 2011). He was also in charge of editing the exhibit's catalogue.

=== Media ===
From October 2012 to January 2013, Volume! editors were offered sequences on François Saltiel's show on Le Mouv'., and the Radio Télévision Suisse dedicated two issues of "Histoire Vivante" to Volume! in October 2013. A partnership with the website La vie des idées, created by historian Pierre Rosanvallon, to publish reviews of books dealing with popular music, was started in November 2013.
