= Norman Johnson (mathematician) =

American mathematician (1930–2017)

- Born: November 12, 1930; Chicago, United States
- Died: July 13, 2017 (aged 86)
- Education: University of Toronto
- Known for: Johnson solid (1966)
- Scientific career
- Fields: Mathematics
- Workplaces: Wheaton College, Norton, Massachusetts
- Doctoral advisor: H. S. M. Coxeter

Norman Woodason Johnson (November 12, 1930 – July 13, 2017) was an American mathematician at Wheaton College, Norton, Massachusetts.

== Early life and education ==
Norman Johnson was born on November 12, 1930 in Chicago. His father had a bookstore and published a local newspaper.

Johnson earned his undergraduate mathematics degree in 1953 at Carleton College in Northfield, Minnesota (Note: "Norman Johnson '53". Carleton College. 2017-07-18.) followed by a master's degree from the University of Pittsburgh. After graduating in 1953, Johnson did alternative civilian service as a conscientious objector. He earned his PhD from the University of Toronto in 1966 with a dissertation title of The Theory of Uniform Polytopes and Honeycombs under the supervision of H. S. M. Coxeter.^{[T66]} From there, he accepted a position in the Mathematics Department of Wheaton College in Massachusetts and taught until his retirement in 1998.

== Career ==
In 1966, Johnson published a paper titled Convex Polyhedra with Regular Faces.^{[A66]} Inside, it contained the list of 92 convex polyhedra with regular faces, along with the coined prefixes on naming some solids; encompassing the family of prisms, antiprisms, and other uniform polyhedra brings up 112 solids in total. Victor Zalgaller later proved in 1969 that Johnson's list of 92 solids was complete, and the set is now known as the Johnson solids or Johnson–Zalgaller solid.

Johnson is also credited with naming all the uniform star polyhedra and their duals, as published in Magnus Wenninger's model building books: Polyhedron models (1971) and Dual models (1983).

== Death and final works ==
He completed final edits for his book Geometries and Transformations^{[B18]} just before his death on July 13, 2017, and nearly completed his manuscript on uniform polytopes.

== Works ==
=== Thesis ===
T66.	———— (1966). The theory of uniform polytopes and honeycombs (PhD thesis). University of Toronto. OL 14849556M. ONLINE

=== Articles and books ===
A60.	———— (1960-05-01). "A Geometric Model for the Generalized Symmetric Group". Canadian Mathematical Bulletin. 3 (2): 133–142. doi:10.4153/CMB-1960-016-7. S2CID 124822323.

A65.	Grünbaum, Branko; ———— (January 1965). "The Faces of a Regular-Faced Polyhedron". Journal of the London Mathematical Society. s1-40 (1): 577–586. doi:10.1112/jlms/s1-40.1.577.

A66.	———— (January 1966). "Convex polyhedra with regular faces". Canadian Journal of Mathematics. 18: 169–200. doi:10.4153/cjm-1966-021-8. ISSN 0008-414X. MR 0185507. S2CID 122006114. Zbl 0132.14603.

A69.	———— (December 1969). "Euclidean Geometry and Convexity by Russell V. Benson (review)". The American Mathematical Monthly. 76 (10): 1165–1160. doi:10.2307/2317227. JSTOR 2317227.

A81.	———— (January 1981). "Absolute Polarities and Central Inversions". In Davis, C.; Grünbaum, B.; Sherk, F. A. (eds.). The Geometric Vein. New York City: Springer Nature. pp. 443–464. doi:10.1007/978-1-4612-5648-9_28. ISBN 978-1-4612-5648-9.

A99a.	————; Weiss, Asia Ivić (July 1999). "Quaternionic modular groups". Linear Algebra and Its Applications. 295 (1): 159–189. doi:10.1016/S0024-3795(99)00107-X.

A99b.	————; Weiss, Asia Ivić (December 1999). "Quadratic Integers and Coxeter Groups". Canadian Journal of Mathematics. 51 (6): 1307–1336. doi:10.4153/CJM-1999-060-6. S2CID 111383205.

A99c.	————; Kellerhals, Ruth; Ratcliffe, John G.; Tschantz, Steven T. (December 1999). "The size of a hyperbolic Coxeter simplex". Transformation Groups. 4 (4): 329–353. doi:10.1007/BF01238563. S2CID 123105209.

A02.	————; Kellerhals, Ruth; Ratcliffe, John G.; Tschantz, Steven T. (2002-04-15). "Commensurability classes of hyperbolic Coxeter groups". Linear Algebra and Its Applications. 345 (1–3): 119–147. doi:10.1016/S0024-3795(01)00477-3.

A12.	———— (2012). "Regular Inversive Polytopes". In Deza, Michel; Petitjean, Michel; Markov, Krassimir (eds.). Mathematics of Distances and Applications. Sofia: ITHEA.

B18.	———— (2018-06-07). Geometries and Transformations. Cambridge University Press. ISBN 978-1-107-10340-5. OCLC 1043026091. OL 27839953M.
