= Canadian Mathematical Society =

Canadian professional association

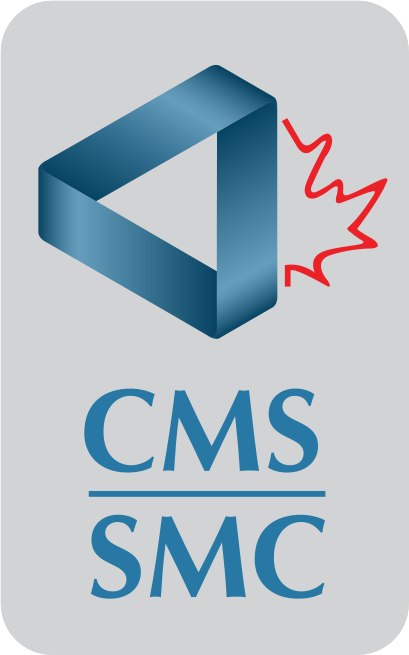
- Formation: June 1945; 81 years ago
- Type: Professional association
- Headquarters: Ottawa, Ontario, Canada
- Members: 1,200+
- Official language: English, French
- President: Dr. Ilia Binder
- Website: cms.math.ca

The Canadian Mathematical Society (CMS; French: Société mathématique du Canada) is an association of professional mathematicians dedicated to advancing mathematical research, outreach, scholarship and education in Canada. The Society serves the national and international communities through the publication of high-quality academic journals and community bulletins, as well as by organizing a variety of mathematical competitions and enrichment programs. These include the Canadian Open Mathematics Challenge (COMC), the Canadian Mathematical Olympiad (CMO), and the selection and training of Canada's team for the International Mathematical Olympiad (IMO) and the European Girls’ Mathematical Olympiad (EGMO).

The CMS was originally conceived in June 1945 as the Canadian Mathematical Congress. A name change was debated for many years; ultimately, a new name was adopted in 1979, upon the Society's incorporation as a non-profit charitable organization.

The Society is affiliated with various national and international mathematical societies, including the Canadian Applied and Industrial Mathematics Society and the Society for Industrial and Applied Mathematics. The CMS is also a member of the International Mathematical Union and the International Council for Industrial and Applied Mathematics.

== History ==
The Canadian Mathematical Society was originally conceived in June 1945 as the Canadian Mathematical Congress. The founding members hoped that "this congress [would] be the beginning of important mathematical development in Canada". Seeking to end confusion with the quadrennial mathematical congresses, a name change was considered for many years. Finally, upon its incorporation as a non-profit, charitable organization in 1978, a new name was adopted – the Canadian Mathematical Society. Since then, the Society has expanded its activities to serve K-12 and post secondary students, as well as professors and established researchers.

Graham P. Wright served as executive director of the CMS from 1979 to 2009. He was a key contributor to virtually all aspects of the Society's operations, including his service as Managing Editor of many of the CMS's scientific publications, his work as an organizer of Math Camps and Mathematics Competitions (notably his work for the 1995 International Mathematical Olympiad held in Toronto), and his tireless efforts in support of the Society's committees and scientific meetings. In addition, he helped build the Society's Executive Office in Ottawa and develop its web-based electronic services.

The Canadian Mathematical Society was to celebrate its 75th anniversary during its 2020 Summer Meeting in Ottawa, Ontario. However, due to the COVID-19 pandemic, the meeting was postponed to 2021 Summer Meeting. The Society is set to celebrate its 80th anniversary during its 2025 Summer Meeting in Québec, QC.

== Activities ==
=== Publications ===
The flagship publications of the CMS are the prominent, peer-reviewed research journals Canadian Journal of Mathematics, which is intended for full research papers, and the Canadian Mathematical Bulletin, which publishes shorter papers. All past issues except the last five volumes are free to download. Access to the most recent research requires a subscription.

In cooperation with Springer Publications, the CMS publishes many text books aimed at a university and academic researcher level. The series is called CMS Books in Mathematics.

The CMS publishes ten issues per year of Crux Mathematicorum, which contains problem-solving challenges and techniques suitable for training in secondary school problem solving competitions such as the Canadian Mathematical Olympiad or the International Mathematical Olympiad. All issues are free to download and use. In the past, the CMS also published A Taste of Mathematics (ATOM), a series of small booklets on a variety of topics suitable for high school enrichment. This series is still available to download and use on the Society's website.

The CMS Notes is the Society's official newsletter, published six times per year and available to members or the public online. It includes news relevant to the Canadian mathematical community, including notice on conferences, columns on research and education, book reviews, award announcements, and employment advertisements for mathematicians.

In April 2024, the CMS launched Math Matters, a weekly newsletters sent to members and subscribers of the Society's mailing list. This newsletter was created to streamline communication by consolidating most updates into one comprehensive weekly edition. Math Matters, distributed on Fridays, serves as a platform to keep the mathematical community updated on announcements, calls, submissions, events, job advertisements, and more.

As of 2025, the CMS is preparing for the launch of its new journal, Canadian Mathematical Communications (CMC), an open-access venue for high-impact papers in all areas of pure and applied mathematics. Deep theories and foundational developments often require more space to develop in full, and while these can be the most important works in a field, authors have a limited number of venues available for publication. CMC will accept high-quality papers in the 41+ page-range.

=== Committees ===
The Canadian Mathematical Society operates through a number of specialized committees that support its mission and guide its activities in key areas. These committees oversee a wide range of functions, including research, education, publications, equity and diversity, outreach, and competitions. Notable examples include the Research Committee, the Education Committee, and the Committee on Women in Mathematics. Each committee is composed of mathematicians from across Canada who contribute their expertise to help shape policy, plan events, evaluate programs, and promote excellence in mathematics. The committees play a vital role in ensuring the CMS remains responsive to the needs of the mathematical community and aligned with its strategic goals.

==== Student Committee ====
The Canadian Mathematical Society's Student Committee (Studc) was formed in 1999. Studc aims to bring together French and English Canadian graduate and undergraduate mathematics students through research and networking events and publication opportunities. Studc manages and publishes Notes from the Margin, a magazine-style publication devoted to publishing accessible research-based content in addition to opinion pieces, news articles, open problems that are of interest to the mathematical community, and brainteaser puzzles.

=== Conferences ===
==== CMS Meetings ====
CMS organizes two bilingual Meetings each year: the CMS Winter Meeting is normally held during the first weekend of December and the CMS Summer Meeting during the first weekend of June. Each Meeting takes place over the course of 3 days, with 2 days of pre-meeting activities. This includes the executive meeting, board of directors meeting, group development luncheon and mini-courses.

CMS Meetings are among the biggest mathematical events in Canada, bringing together over 800 of the most respected researchers, educators, post-doctorates and students in mathematics and related fields from around the world. The meetings include many scientific sessions and plenary, prize and public lectures.

==== Canadian Undergraduate Mathematics Conference ====
Through its Student Committee, the CMS is the main sponsor for the bilingual Canadian Undergraduate Mathematics Conference (CUMC), an annual research and networking conference held each summer and targeted at Canadian undergraduates interested in any area of pure or applied mathematics. It is entirely student-run and driven by Studc. Delegates may opt to present a poster or paper, as well as a short talk on a topic of their choosing. The location of the conference is alternated between central Canada (defined as Ontario and Québec) and Western or Eastern Canada every other year, with host applications being submitted by hopefuls a year in advance.

==== CWiMAC ====
The Women in Mathematics committee of the CMS also runs Connecting Women in Mathematics Across Canada (CWiMAC), a workshop and conference aimed at upcoming Canadian female mathematicians. In particular, they target current PhD students and new postdoctoral fellows seeking guidance in their field. The conference strives to strengthen the community between young female mathematicians and their senior counterparts through the building of mentorship, relationships, and networking.

=== Competitions ===
The CMS organizes and supports a broad array of mathematics competitions that nurture talent, inspire young mathematicians, and promote excellence in problem-solving across the country. These competitions range from accessible challenges for younger students to elite contests that identify candidates for international representation.

Canada Lynx Mathematical Competition (CLMC)

The Society's newest competition, the Canada Lynx Mathematical Competition (CLMC), is an inclusive national math contest to help develop students’ skills in math. This competition was created to foster an interest in mathematics among students regardless of their skill level, to increase student confidence in their math abilities, and to present mathematics as a fun and playful subject to students.

Canadian Open Mathematics Challenge (COMC)

The Canadian Open Mathematics Challenge (COMC) is the CMS's largest national competition and Canada's most prestigious mathematical competition. It serves as a gateway for students aspiring to compete at the highest levels. Open to all secondary school students, the COMC features creative and challenging problems that emphasize deep mathematical thinking beyond the standard curriculum.

Canada Jay Mathematical Competition (CJMC)

The Canada Jay Mathematical Competition (CJMC) (originally named the Canadian Mathematical Gray Jay Competition) is an entry-level mathematics competition organized by the Canadian Mathematical Society, designed to introduce students in grades 5 through 8 to the world of problem-solving and mathematical thinking. Launched in 2020, the CJMC emphasizes creativity, logic, and reasoning, making it accessible and engaging for younger learners.

Canadian (Junior) Mathematical Olympiad (C[J]MO)

High-achieving students from the COMC are invited to participate in more advanced, invitation-based competitions, including the Canadian Mathematical Olympiad (CMO) and the Canadian Junior Mathematical Olympiad (CJMO). These are proof-based contests that reward rigorous reasoning and elegant problem-solving. Students who narrowly miss qualifying directly for the CMO may be invited to the CMO Repêchage, a second-chance competition that can lead to CMO participation.

International Mathematical Olympiad (IMO)

The CMS is the sole organization responsible for the selection and training of Math Team Canada for the International Mathematical Olympiad (IMO), the premier global competition for high school students. Canada has been participating in the IMO since 1981 and has consistently earned recognition for its talented team members.

European Girls’ Mathematical Olympiad (EGMO)

The CMS is also responsible for the selection and training of Girls’ Math Team Canada for the European Girls’ Mathematical Olympiad (EGMO). The EGMO is an international competition that aims to encourage young women in mathematics by providing a high-level, inclusive, and supportive environment. The CMS has been sending Girls’ Math Team Canada to the EGMO since 2018, helping to foster gender equity and representation in mathematics.

Asian Pacific Mathematics Olympiad (APMO)

The CMS supports student participation in other invitational contests such as the Asian Pacific Mathematics Olympiad (APMO). While not directly funded or administered by the CMS, the APMO offers additional opportunities for top-performing students to engage in international-level competition.

=== Outreach ===
==== Math Camps ====
The Canadian Mathematical Society supports a nationwide network of mathematics enrichment camps that provide students with opportunities to deepen their mathematical understanding, connect with peers who share similar interests, and explore topics beyond the standard school curriculum. These camps are organized and hosted by universities and other educational institutions across Canada and receive funding and coordination support from the CMS. Some CMS math camps are based on invitation and are targeted at high-potential students from all backgrounds, and others are open to all students with interest in mathematics.

Each year, the CMS helps organize and fund around 25 regional and national Math Camps, which are typically aimed at students from kindergarten to grade 12 with an interest and aptitude in mathematics. These regular camps offer a variety of engaging activities including problem-solving workshops, lectures, mathematical games, and team challenges.

In addition to regular math camps, the CMS also supports specialty camps that focus on promoting diversity and inclusion within the mathematical community. These camps are specifically designed for underserved youth, such as girls and gender minorities, Indigenous students, and other historically underrepresented groups in mathematics. The goal of these programs is to provide supportive environments that encourage broader participation and confidence in mathematical exploration.

In 2023, the CMS launched its own CMS Summer Math Camp held in Ottawa, Ontario. This new initiative creates an environment for children to develop a passion for mathematics through exciting mathematical challenges with positive role models while building new friendships. This camp curriculum was exclusively created by the Canadian Mathematical Society. This camp is open for anyone who wishes to attend (as opposed to being invitation-based). The CMS Summer Math Camp reflects the Society's growing commitment to hands-on education and talent development.

==== Endowment Grants ====
Annually, the Canadian Mathematical Society funds projects that contribute to the broader good of the Canadian mathematical community through the CMS Endowment Grants. Since the program's inception in 1999, the CMS has awarded over $200,000 in grants to a wide variety of mathematical initiatives. Projects funded by the Endowment Grants must be consistent with the interests of the CMS – to promote the advancement, discovery, learning and application of mathematics.

==== Competition Grants ====
To further support mathematical outreach, the Canadian Mathematical Society also offers math competition grants for activities at the elementary and secondary school levels.

== Awards ==
The CMS presents a range of awards recognizing excellence in mathematical research, education, outreach, and service within the Canadian mathematical community:

- The Jeffery–Williams Prize, awarded annually, recognizes mathematicians who have made outstanding contributions to mathematical research.
- The Adrien Pouliot Award, awarded annually, recognizes contributions to mathematical education in Canada.
- The David Borwein Distinguished Career Award, awarded every four years, recognizes individuals who have made exceptional, broad, and continued contributions to Canadian mathematics.
- The Graham Wright Award for Distinguished Service, awarded annually, recognizes individuals who have made sustained and significant contributions to the Canadian mathematical community and, in particular, to the Canadian Mathematical Society.
- The Excellence in Teaching Award, awarded annually, recognizes sustained and distinguished contributions in teaching at the post-secondary undergraduate level.
- The G. de B. Robinson Award, awarded annually, recognizes the publication of excellent papers in Canadian Journal of Mathematics and the Canadian Mathematical Bulletin
- The CMS Blair Spearman Doctoral Prize, awarded annually, recognizes outstanding performance by a doctoral student.
- The Krieger–Nelson Prize, awarded annually, is presented in recognition of an outstanding female in mathematics.
- The Coxeter–James Prize, awarded annually, recognizes young mathematicians who have made outstanding contributions to mathematical research.
- The Cathleen Synge Morawetz Prize, awarded annually, recognizes an outstanding research publication or series of closely related publications.

== Leadership ==
=== Presidents ===
Sources:

- Samuel Beatty (1945–1949)
- Adrien Pouliot (1949–1953)
- Gilbert de Beauregard Robinson (1953–1957)
- Ralph Lent Jeffery (1957–1961)
- Ralph James (1961–1963)
- Max Wyman (1963–1965)
- H. S. M. Coxeter (1965–1967)
- Maurice L'Abbé (1967–1969)
- Nathan Mendelsohn (1969–1971)
- George F. D. Duff (1971–1973)
- Albert John Coleman (1973–1975)
- William O. J. Moser (1975–1977)
- Rémi Vaillancourt (1977–1979)
- Peter Lancaster (1979–1981)
- Paul G. Rooney (1981–1983)
- Renzo Piccinini (1983–1985)
- David Borwein (1985–1987)
- Carl Herz (1987–1989)
- Frederick V. Atkinson (1989–1991)
- Sherman D. Riemenschneider (1991–1992)
- Michel Delfour (1992–1994)
- Peter Fillmore (1994–1996)
- Katherine Heinrich (1996–1998)
- Richard Kane (1998–2000)
- Jonathan Borwein (2000–2002)
- Christiane Rousseau (2002–2004)
- H. E. A. Campbell (2004–2006)
- Tom Salisbury (2006–2008)
- Anthony Lau (2008–2010)
- Jacques Hurtubise (2010–2012)
- Keith Taylor (2012–2014)
- Lia Bronsard (2014–2016)
- Michael Bennett (2016–2018)
- Mark Lewis (2018–2020)
- Javad Mashreghi (2020–2022)
- David Pike (2022–2024)
- Barbara Csima (2024–2025)
- Ilia Binder (2025–2026)
- Javad Mashreghi (2026–present)

=== *Executive Directors and Chief Executive Officer ===
Sources:

- Georges Perras (1945–1949)
- Father R. E. O’Connor (1945–1971)
- Abel Gauthier (1949–1961)
- L. F. S. Ritcey (1958–1966)
- J. M. A. Maranda (1961–1969)
- John J. McNamee (1966–1969, 1973–1979)
- Jean L. Lavoie (1970–1972)
- Graham Wright (1979–2009)
- Johan Rudnick (2010–2015)
- Termeh Kousha, Chief Executive Officer (2018–present)

*The title and structure of this role have evolved over time. In the earlier years of the Society, positions with responsibilities similar to those of the current Chief Executive Officer were referred to as “Secretary”, “Secretary-Treasurer”, or “Executive Director”. Termeh Kousha was appointed Executive Director in 2018, and her title was changed to Chief Executive Officer in 2026.

== See also ==
- Atlantic Association for Research in the Mathematical Sciences
- Pacific Institute for the Mathematical Sciences
- Fields Institute
- Centre de recherches mathématiques
- London Mathematical Society
- Australian Mathematical Society
- American Mathematical Society
- Mathematical Association of America
- List of mathematical societies
