= Cahiers Agricultures =

- Discipline: Agricultural science
- Language: English, French

Publication details
- History: 1992–present
- Publisher: EDP Sciences (France)
- Frequency: Upon acceptance
- Open access: Yes
- License: Creative Commons
- Impact factor: 1.053 (2020)

Standard abbreviations
- ISO 4: Cah. Agric.

Indexing
- ISSN: 1166-7699 (print); 1777-5949 (web)
- OCLC no.: 992956831

Links
- Journal homepage; Online access

Cahiers Agricultures is a peer-reviewed open access scientific journal covering research on farming systems worldwide, the way they are changing, and their role in society. The journal publishes articles, short communications, reviews, comments, and replies, mainly in French language. It is published by EDP Sciences and the editor-in-chief is Jean-Yves Jamin (Centre de coopération internationale en recherche agronomique pour le développement). The journal was established in 1992 and it has been published by EDP Sciences since 2016.

== Abstracting and indexing ==
The journal is abstracted and indexed in:

- AGRICOLA
- AGRIS
- CAB Abstracts
- Scopus
- Science Citation Index Expanded

According to the 2021 Journal Citation Reports, the journal has a 2020 impact factor of 1.053.
