= Volume! =

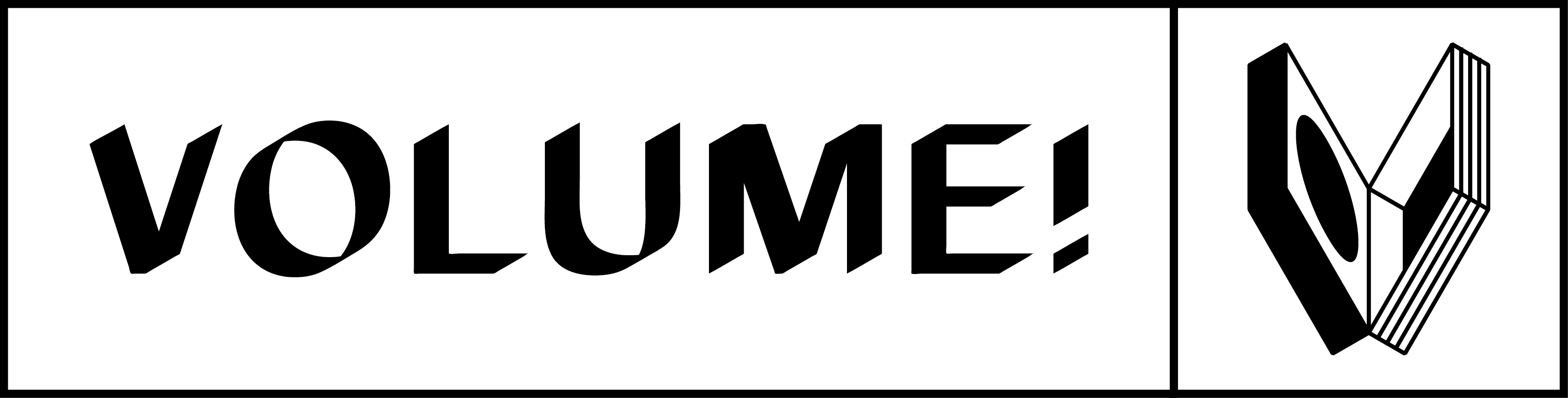
- Discipline: Popular music studies
- Language: English, French
- Edited by: Emmanuel Parent

Publication details
- Former names: Copyright Volume! Musiques actuelles et problématiques plastiques
- History: 2002–present
- Publisher: Éditions Mélanie Seteun (2002-2024), Presses Universitaires de Rennes (2025-) (France)
- Frequency: Biannual
- Open access: Delayed, after 2 years

Standard abbreviations
- ISO 4: Volume!

Indexing
- ISSN: 1634-5495 (print); 1950-568X (web)
- OCLC no.: 237795939

Links
- Journal homepage; Volume! on Cairn.info

Volume! The French Journal of Popular Music Studies (subtitled in French: La revue des musiques populaires) is a biannual peer-reviewed academic journal, created in 2001, and "dedicated to the study of contemporary popular music".

== History ==
The journal's first issue was published in 2002, under the title Copyright Volume!. It was created a year earlier by Gérôme Guibert, Marie-Pierre Bonniol, and Samuel Étienne, and opted for its current name in 2009. Étienne was its first editor-in-chief (2002–2008), before Stéphane Dorin (2009), Gérôme Guibert (2010–2017), Emmanuel Parent (2017–2022) took over. In 2024, Catherine Rudent and Louise Barrière started their five-year term at the head of the journal.

== Special issues ==
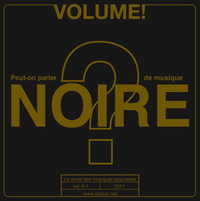
Volume ! n°8-1 "Peut-on parler de musique noire ?" ("What is it we call 'Black music'?")

The journal publishes special issues on various topics in popular music studies, new musicology, ethnomusicology, sociology, geography, cultural history, cultural studies, aesthetics, communication studies, etc.

Recent topics include music genres (2023, n° 20–1), the relations between popular music studies and ethnomusicology (2022, n° 19–2), the Canterbury progressive rock scene (2022, n° 19–1), the question of expertise (2021, n° 18–2), work in popular music (2022, n° 18–1), hip-hop scenes (2021, n° 17–2), the pop voice (2021, n° 16-2/17-1), hacking (2020, n° 16–1), metal music (2019, n° 15–2), music videos (2018, n° 14–2), Jamaican Music (2017, n° 13–2), French punk scenes (2016, N° 13–1), The Beatles (2016, n° 12–2), French chanson and immigration (2015, n°12-1), "nostalgia" (2015, n°11-1), music and dance (2014, n°10-2), "listening" (2013, n°10-1), Black music (2011, n°8-1) gender and race issues in hip hop (2011, n°8-2), "metal studies", "countercultures" (2012, n°9-1 & 9–2), and cover versions (2010, n°7-1 & 7–2),

Volume! publishes a "varia" section for articles not related to the main topic, plus editorials, letters, and book reviews.

== Publication & distribution ==
=== Publisher ===
From 2002 to 2024, the journal was published by the independent publishing association Éditions Mélanie Seteun, which specializes in popular music studies. In 2025, it joined the catalogue of the Presses Universitaires de Rennes.

=== Print distribution ===
It's print version was originally distributed by the IRMA (now part of the French National Centre for Music), and has been distributed by Les Presses du réel since 2015.

=== Online access ===
Since November 2011, Volume ! was included in the French academic journals portal OpenEdition (formerly Revues.org) and since December 2011 in the Belgian portal, Cairn.info (six latest issues, four under restricted access). Since June 2016, it is also on RILM Abstracts of Music Literature with Full Text.

=== Abstracting and indexing ===
The journal is abstracted and indexed in the International Index to Music Periodicals, the Répertoire International de Littérature Musicale, the Music Index and Music & Performing Arts Online. The articles dealing with jazz are indexed on the Jazz Institut Darmstadt bibliography and the ones dealing with heavy metal/hard rock on the University of Central Missouri/ISMMS's metal studies bibliography. Volume ! is registered by the AERES in the 18th section ("Arts").

== Sponsors and official classification ==
The journal is classified by the HCERES in three academic disciplines: "Arts" (18th section of the French National Council of Universities [CNU], May 2012), "Sociology, demography" (19th section, October 2025) and "Information and Communication Sciences" (71st section, October 2026). It is financially supported by the IRMÉCCEN (EA 7546, Sorbonne Nouvelle University), the « Arts : Pratiques et Poétiques » research unit (EA 3208, Rennes 2 University), the French-speaking branch of the International Association for the Study of Popular Music, and the InIdEX ICCA (ANR-18-IDEX-0001).

It has in the past received the support of the French National Book Center (Centre national du livre (2009, 2016) and the French National Centre for Scientific Research. and Centre national de la musique (2024-2025).

== Events and partnerships ==
=== French-speaking branch of the IASPM ===
The journal is a frequent partner of the French-speaking branch of the International Association for the Study of Popular Music (IASPM). In 2010, it established an "early research" (formerly "young researchers") prize with the French-speaking branch of the IASPM.

=== Vibrations. Musiques, médias, société ===
Volume! and the Éditions Mélanie Seteun were in charge of the electronic publication of the first French academic journal dedicated to popular music Vibrations. Musiques, médias, société, created by Antoine Hennion, Jean-Rémy Julien and Jean-Claude Klein in the mid-1980s, on the French academic portal Persée.

=== Ashgate ===
It also published a special international, English edition of its "countercultures" issues with Ashgate Publishing (now owned by Routledge) a partnership with the Éditions Mélanie Seteun that had already taken place for the publication of the book Stereo: Comparative Perspectives on the Sociological Study of Popular Music in France and Britain.

=== Conferences ===
It has co-organized many conferences, among which:

- "Rock and violences in Europe (1955-1990)", in 2017;
- "Conçues pour durer. Perspectives francophones sur les musiques hip-hop";
- "Heavy metal et sciences sociales : un état des lieux de la recherche francophone" in Angers (December 2014),;
- the 2013 "Changing the Tune. Popular music and politics in the XXIst century" international conference in Strasbourg with the German association ASPM and the French branch of the IASPM.;
- In November 2012, it participated in the conference on "Digital Publishing in the Humanities. Perspectives from France and Canada" organized by the French Consulate in Toronto, the French Institute, the University of Toronto, and York University.;
- "What is it we call "Black music"?" in Bordeaux, 2010.

=== Events ===
It organizes events (conferences, concerts) with various institutions, such as the Musée du Quai Branly, the Centre Georges Pompidou public library, the Cité de la Musique, the Philharmonie de Paris, La Gaîté Lyrique, the Collège International de Philosophie, or the Centre Musical Fleury Goutte d'Or-Barbara, as well as with record labels/festivals, such as the festival "F.A.M.E. Film Music & Experience" in March 2014, or in May 2012, the "Humanist Records Festival #3" and venues, such as the Point Éphémère.

The "Great Black Music" exhibit at the Cité de la Musique in Paris was co-curated by journalist Marc Benaïche and ethnomusicologist Emmanuel Parent. The latter, a member of the journal's team since 2004, had co-organized the 2010 "What is it we call Black Music?" (Peut-on parler de musique noire ?) conference in Bordeaux whose proceedings were published in Volume! (n°8-1, 2011). He was also in charge of editing the exhibit's catalogue.

=== Media ===
From October 2012 to January 2013, Volume! editors were offered sequences on François Saltiel's show on Le Mouv'., and the Radio Télévision Suisse dedicated two issues of "Histoire Vivante" to Volume! in October 2013. A partnership with the website La vie des idées, created by historian Pierre Rosanvallon, to publish reviews of books dealing with popular music, was started in November 2013.
