= Canadian Open Mathematics Challenge =

Canadian youth mathematics competition

- Type: Math competition
- Headquarters: Ottawa, Ontario, Canada
- Location: Nationwide
- Official language: English, French
- Website: comc.math.ca

The Canadian Open Mathematics Challenge (COMC) is an annual mathematics competition held in Canada during the month of October. This competition is run by the Canadian Mathematical Society. Students who score exceptionally well on this competition are selected to participate in the Canadian Mathematical Olympiad.

== Participation ==
The COMC is written on a select day in October each year and is proctored by teachers across Canada. In order to participate in this competition, students must register through their school’s mathematics department and pay any fees associated with the competition. Following the day of the competition, exams are returned to a network of university partners across Canada for marking.

== Eligibility ==
The competition is open to any student with an interest in mathematics. However, to be official participants, students must satisfy the following criteria:

- must be in full-time attendance at an elementary or secondary school, or CEGEP since September of the year of the COMC; and
- be less than 19 years old as of June 30 of the year of the COMC.

Students writing from outside Canada are not eligible for cash awards but compete for ranking in the International division.

Students not meeting the qualification requirements can still participate and marks as “unofficial” competitors.

== Format ==
The COMC consists of three sections:

- 4 basic questions (Part A) for 4 marks each,
- 4 intermediary questions (Part B) for 6 marks each, and
- 4 advanced questions (Part C) for 10 marks each

for a total of 80 marks.

The length of the contest is 2.5 hours. Calculators are not permitted.

== Awards and Prizes ==
There are two divisions: Canadian Awards, which is only for participants writing the exam from within Canada; and International Awards, which is only for participants writing it outside of Canada.

Canadian Award Categories

There are award categories for Best in Canada and Best in Province and Best in Region for all students as well as for students at each grade. For example:

- Best in Canada Overall: all official participants (regardless of grade) in Canada compete for this, the most prestigious category,
- Best in Canada, Grade 11: all Grade 11 students in Canada compete for this,
- Best in BC (overall): all official participants (regardless of grade) in British Columbia,
- Best in BC, Grade 12: all Grade 12 students in BC,
- Best in Toronto (overall): all official participants in Toronto-area schools,
- Best in Toronto, Grade 12: All grade 12 and CEGEP students in Toronto compete for this category
- etc.

The top six unique scores in any category earn awards: Gold, Silver, Bronze, Honourable Mention.

The top students in Canada also normally receive cash awards based on their ranking.

International Awards

The top official participants from outside Canada are considered for the international awards division, which is not grade-dependent. The top three unique scores are given Gold, Silver or Bronze. Additionally, any international student who achieves at least a score as high as the lowest Best in Canada Overall Honourable Mention will receive an Honourable Mention award in the International division.

Invitational Competitions and Math Team Canada

The top students who are Canadian Citizens or Permanent Residents (independent of grade or where they live or attend school) will be invited to participate in the Canadian Mathematical Olympiad (CMO) competition. Students who perform well on the CMO are selected for Math Team Canada, which represents Canada at the International Mathematical Olympiad (IMO) the following summer.

Approximately the top 50 COMC students are invited to write the CMO. The next approximately 75 COMC students are invited to write the CMO Qualifying Repêchage. Approximately the top 10-15 students from the Repêchage will also be invited to write the CMO.

Scholarships

Competition results will be shared with Canadian partner universities to help them consider offering academic scholarships to high-potential students.

Camps

Approximately 24 Canadian students in grade 8, 9 or 10 with strong performance on the COMC will be invited to the summer Canada Math Camp (CMC) hosted by the University of Toronto.

Canadian students who demonstrate solid performance at their grade level in their region or province may be invited to a summer regional CMS Math Camp staged in collaboration with a CMS university partner in their province.

Participation Certificates (Quartiles) and Prizes

When the final results are announced, teachers/organizers will be able to log into their accounts to download and print the Award or Participation certificates for all their students.

Certificate titles are based on the quartile into which the student's score falls:

- 1st quartile = Performance with Distinction
- 2nd quartile = Performance with Honours
- 3rd or 4th quartile = Certificate of Participation

== Random Prize Draw ==
A number of prizes are given to randomly-drawn participants writing the COMC in Canada. The chance of winning a prize depends on the respective number of national, provincial, or regional participants.

Teachers who participate in the COMC are also eligible for their own random prize draw.

== See also ==
- List of mathematics competitions
- Canadian Mathematical Olympiad
