= Afrique contemporaine =

- Discipline: African studies
- Language: French

Publication details
- History: 1962–present
- Publisher: De Boeck (Belgium)
- Frequency: Quarterly

Standard abbreviations
- ISO 4: Afr. Contemp.

Indexing
- ISSN: 0002-0478 (print); 1782-138X (web)
- LCCN: sf82006904
- OCLC no.: 781744592

Links
- Journal homepage; Online archive

Afrique contemporaine is a quarterly peer-reviewed academic journal published by De Boeck Brussels, Belgium.
