= Ralph Lent Jeffery =

Canadian mathematician (1889–1975)

Ralph Lent Jeffery (3 October 1889 Overton, Yarmouth County, Nova Scotia, Canada – 1975 Wolfville, Nova Scotia) was a Canadian mathematician working on analysis.

He taught at several institutions including Acadia University, the University of Saskatchewan and Queen's University. Jeffery Hall at Queen's was named for him. In 1937 he was elected a Fellow of the Royal Society of Canada.

In 1925 Jeffery exhibited a bounded function of two real variables, continuous in each, yet fails to have an integral.

In 1951 Jeffery published Theory of Functions of a Real Variable which was noted for its coverage of integration theory.

== Selected papers ==
- 1925: "Definite integrals containing a parameter", Annals of Mathematics 26(3): 173 to 80 doi:10.2307/1967895
- 1926: "Functions of two variables for which the double integral does not exist", American Mathematical Monthly 33(3): 142,3
- 1931: "The uniform approximation of a sequence of integrals", American Journal of Mathematics 53(1): 61 to 71
- 1933: "Sets of k-extent in n-dimensional space", Transactions of the American Mathematical Society 35(3): 629 to 47 doi:10.2307/1989852
