= Canadian Mathematical Olympiad =

Canadian mathematics competition

The Canadian Mathematical Olympiad (CMO) is Canada's top mathematical problem-solving competition. It is run by the Canadian Mathematical Society. The Olympiad plays several roles in Canadian mathematics competitions, most notably being Canada's main team selection process for the International Mathematical Olympiad.

== Qualification ==
Approximately 70–80 people qualify for and are invited to write the CMO each year. Students must not have written the Putnam Competition and must meet age, full-time school enrollment, and Canadian Citizenship (or permanent residency) requirements. Students do not have to be living in Canada, as long as they are Canadian citizens.

Participants are invited to write the CMO usually because of excellent results at the Canadian Open Mathematics Challenge (COMC). Approximately the top 50 students from the COMC earn invitations to the CMO. A Qualifying Repêchage (CMOQR) is offered as a "second chance" for the next highest 50–75 students from the COMC. Approximately 20–25 students are chosen from the Repêchage and are then invited to the CMO.

Top students in certain other top Canadian competitions may also be considered for invitations. The organizing committee may also invite participants based on their earlier CMO experience or their performance at APMO or USAMO competitions.

== Competition Layout ==
The competition is three hours long. There are five questions on the CMO, each worth seven marks, for a total of 35 points. Each problem is graded the same way as it is on the IMO.

From 1969 to 1972, the CMO was ten questions long. In the 1970s, the exam length changed a number of times before finally stabilizing to five questions in 1979.

The CMS does not formally disclose its marking procedure, however in the past the following model was used:

- Two graders grade the questions. If there is a dispute between the graders by more than one point, they will reconsider the problem until a consensus is reached.
- If no work was done or very insignificant progress was made, the answer is graded zero.
- If significant progress is made, marks of 1, 2, or 3 will be given, depending on the amount progress toward solving the problem.
- Marks of 4 or 5 are given for answers that are essentially correct, but are poorly presented or lack showing of work in some areas.
- If the solution has a minor error that can be trivially fixed, it is given a 6.
- An absolutely perfect solution is awarded a mark of 7. This might be given if there is an error in the writing that does not affect the solution in any meaningful way.

== Awards ==
There are several different types of rewards for doing well on the CMO:

- Six to eight of the top CMO participants are selected each year for Math Team Canada They are trained and sent to represent Canada at the International Mathematical Olympiad, the pinnacle of high school mathematical competition.
- For students who write in Canada, cash prizes are awarded to the top performers. If there are no "ties", then $2000 goes to 1st place, $1500 to 2nd, $1000 to 3rd, and $500 for Honourable Mention (typically there are up to six people receiving Honourable Mention). When there are ties, prize money is pooled upwards (e.g. a tie for first means the co-winners share $3500 and no one gets "2nd").
- The top student in Canada is recognized as the CMO Champion and his or her name is engraved on the CMO Championship Cup.
- Top students are identified on the official web site to certify their high performance

== Winners ==
Year	Winner	City	School
2024	Warren Bei	West Vancouver, BC	Rockridge Secondary School
2023	Warren Bei	West Vancouver, BC	Rockridge Secondary School
2022	Zixiang Zhou	London, ON	London Central Secondary School
2021	Warren Bei	Vancouver, BC	Homeschooled
2020	Thomas Guo	Exeter, NH	Phillips Exeter Academy
2019	William Zhao	Richmond Hill, ON	Richmond Hill High School
2018	Victor Rong	Toronto, ON	Marc Garneau Collegiate Institute
2017	Thomas Guo	Markham, ON	William Berczy Public School
2016	Kai Sun	London, ON	A.B. Lucas Secondary School
2015	Alexander Whatley	Spring, TX	North Houston Academy of Science and Mathematics
2014	Zhuoqun (Alex) Song	Exeter, NH	Phillips Exeter Academy
2013	Calvin Deng	Cary, NC	NC School of Science & Math
2012	Calvin Deng	Cary, NC	NC School of Science & Math
2011	Mariya Sardarli	Edmonton, AB	Strathcona Composite High School
2010	Alex Song	Windsor, ON	Vincent Massey Secondary School
2009	Jonathan Schneider	Toronto, ON	University of Toronto Schools
2008	Chen Sun	London, ON	A.B. Lucas Secondary School
2007	Yan Li	Scarborough, ON	Dr. Norman Bethune Collegiate Institute
2006	Dong Uk (David) Rhee	Edmonton, AB	McNally Composite High School
2005	Peng Shi	Agincourt, ON	Sir John A. Macdonald Collegiate Institute
2004	Yufei Zhao	Don Mills, ON	Don Mills Collegiate Institute
2003	János Kramár	Toronto, ON	University of Toronto Schools
2002	Tianyi Han	Toronto, ON	Woburn Collegiate Institute
2001	Daniel Brox	West Vancouver, BC	Sentinel Secondary School
2000	Daniel Brox	West Vancouver, BC	Sentinel Secondary School
1999	Jimmy Chui	North York, ON	Earl Haig Secondary School
1998	Adrian Chan	Toronto, ON	Upper Canada College
1997	Sabin Cautis	North York, ON	Earl Haig Secondary School
1996	Byung-Kyu Chun	Edmonton, AB	Harry Ainlay Composite High School
1995	Donny Cheung	Winnipeg, MB	St. John's-Ravenscourt School
1994	Kevin Purbhoo	Toronto, ON	Northern Secondary School
1993	Naoki Sato	Toronto, ON	University of Toronto Schools
1992	J.P. Grossman	Toronto, ON	Northern Secondary School
1991	Ian Goldberg (tie)	Toronto, ON	University of Toronto Schools
	J.P. Grossman (tie)	Toronto, ON	Northern Secondary School
1990	J.P. Grossman	Toronto, ON	Northern Secondary School
1989	Eli Michael Lapell	Scarborough, ON	Woburn Collegiate Institute
1988	Gurraj Sangha	Windsor, ON	Hon.W.C. Kennedy Collegiate Institute
1987	Ravi D. Vakil	Etobicoke, ON	Martingrove Collegiate Institute
1986	Ravi D. Vakil	Etobicoke, ON	Martingrove Collegiate Institute
1985	Minh Tue Vo	Montréal, QC	École Secondaire St-Luc
1984	Minh Tue Vo	Montréal, QC	École Secondaire St-Luc
1983	William James Rucklidge	Toronto, ON	Toronto French School
1982	Alastair Rucklidge	Toronto, ON	Toronto French School
1981	David W. Ash	Thunder Bay, ON	Fort William Collegiate Institute
1980	John J. Chew, III	Toronto, ON	University of Toronto Schools
1979	W. Ross Brown	Gloucester, ON	Ashbury College
1978	Michael Albert	Penetanguishene, ON	Penetanguishene Secondary School
1977	Igor Rivin	Windsor, ON	Vincent Massey Secondary School
1976	Rajiv Gupta	Thunder Bay, ON	Sir Winston Churchill C.V.I.
1975	Patrick Smith (tie)	Montreal, QC	Monkland High School
	James Williams (tie)	Ottawa, ON	Merivale High School
1974	James Williams	Ottawa, ON	Merivale High School
1973	Alan Listoe (tie)	Saskatoon, SK	Aden Bowman Collegiate
	Luc St-Louis (tie)	Montréal, QC	CEGEP de Maisonneuve
1972	Donald T. Kersey	Hamilton, ON	Hill Park Secondary School
1971	Bruce Neilson	Vancouver, BC	Point Grey Secondary School
1970	John Spouge	Vancouver, BC	St. George's School
1969	Karl Morin-Strom (né Karl Strom)	Sault Ste-Marie, ON	Sir James Dunn Secondary School

== See also ==
- Canadian Open Mathematics Challenge
- International Mathematical Olympiad
- List of mathematics competitions
