= Canadian Journal of Mathematics =

- Discipline: Mathematics
- Language: French, English
- Edited by: Henry Kim, Robert McCann

Publication details
- History: 1949–present
- Publisher: Cambridge University Press on behalf of the Canadian Mathematical Society
- Frequency: Bimonthly
- Impact factor: 1.071 (2020)

Standard abbreviations
- ISO 4: Can. J. Math.
- MathSciNet: Canad. J. Math.

Indexing
- ISSN: 0008-414X (print); 1496-4279 (web)

Links
- Journal homepage

The Canadian Journal of Mathematics (French: Journal canadien de mathématiques) is a bimonthly mathematics journal published by the Canadian Mathematical Society.

It was established in 1949 by H. S. M. Coxeter and G. de B. Robinson. The current editors-in-chief of the journal are Henry Kim and Robert McCann. The journal publishes articles in all areas of mathematics.

== See also ==
- Canadian Mathematical Bulletin
- List of French-language academic journals
