= Canadian Mathematical Bulletin =

- Discipline: Mathematics
- Language: French, English
- Edited by: Antonio Lei, Javad Mashreghi

Publication details
- Publisher: Cambridge University Press on behalf of the Canadian Mathematical Society
- Frequency: Quarterly
- Impact factor: 0.721 (2020)

Standard abbreviations
- ISO 4: Can. Math. Bull.
- MathSciNet: Canad. Math. Bull.

Indexing
- ISSN: 0008-4395 (print); 1496-4287 (web)

Links
- Journal homepage

The Canadian Mathematical Bulletin (French: Bulletin Canadien de Mathématiques) is a mathematics journal, established in 1958 and published quarterly by the Canadian Mathematical Society. The current editors-in-chief of the journal are Antonio Lei and Javad Mashreghi. The journal publishes short articles in all areas of mathematics that are of sufficient interest to the general mathematical public.

== Abstracting and indexing ==
The journal is abstracted in:

- Mathematical Reviews
- Web of Science
- Scopus
- Zentralblatt MATH

== See also ==
- Canadian Journal of Mathematics
