= Augmented dodecahedron =

58th Johnson solid (16 faces)

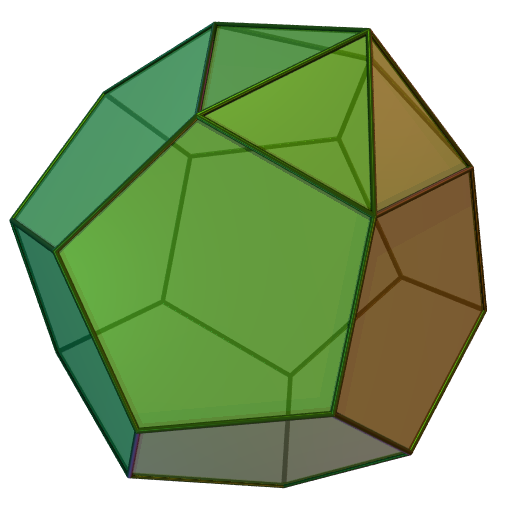
- Type: Johnson; J_{57} – J_{58} – J_{59}
- Faces: 5 triangles 11 pentagons
- Edges: 35
- Vertices: 21
- Vertex configuration: 3.5(5^{3}); 5(3^{2}.5^{2}); 1(3^{5})
- Symmetry group: C_{5v}
- Properties: convex

Net
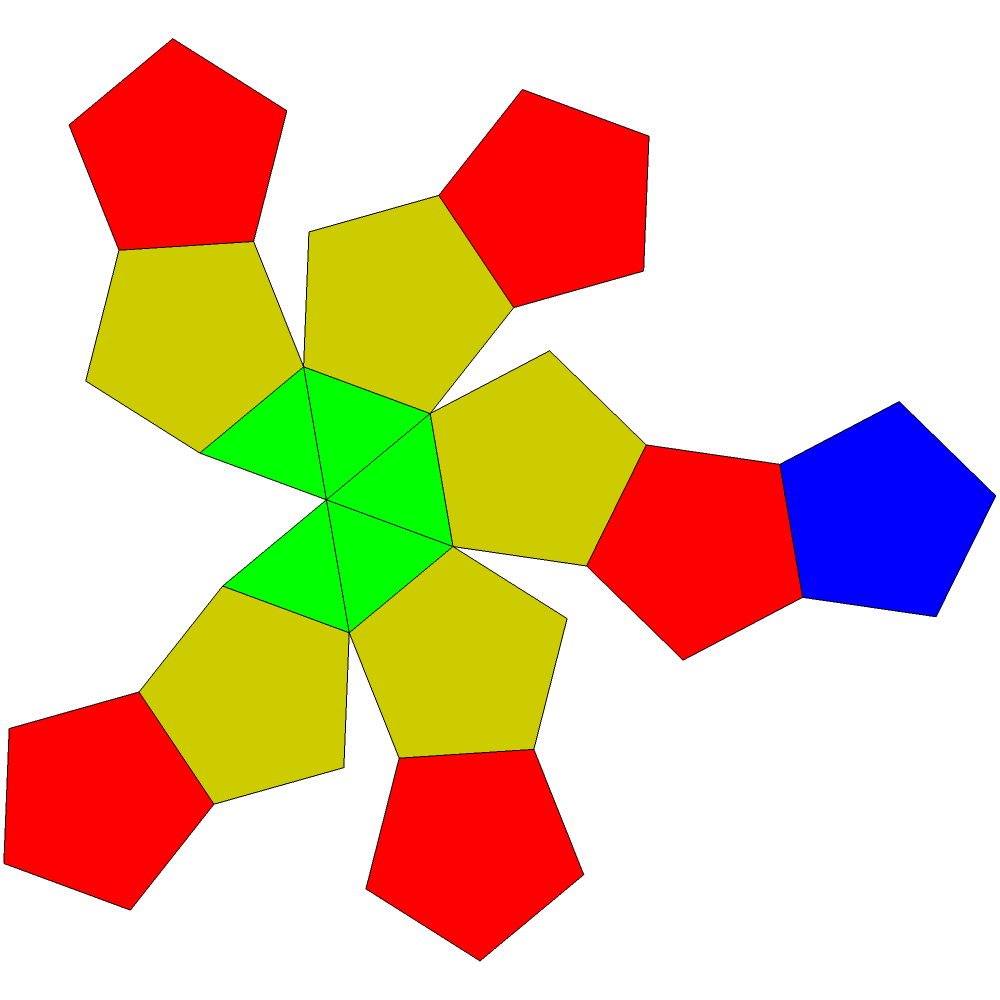

In geometry, the augmented dodecahedron is a Johnson solid combining a regular dodecahedron and a pentagonal pyramid.

3D model of an augmented dodecahedron

== Construction ==
An augmented dodecahedron is constructed from a regular dodecahedron, a twelve-sided polyhedron with regular pentagons, by attaching a regular-faced pentagonal pyramid to one of the regular dodecahedron's faces; the regular polygons mean that all of its internal angles and edges are equal. The resulting polyhedron covers one pentagon from a dodecahedron with five equilateral triangles from the pyramid. Ergo, the augmented dodecahedron has eleven pentagonal faces and five equilateral triangular faces, totaling sixteen faces. The augmented is Johnson solid, a convex polyhedron with regular faces, enumerated as the fifty-eighth $J_{58}$.

== Properties ==
The surface area of an augmented dodecahedron $A$ is obtained by summing the area of its faces, eleven regular pentagons and five equilateral triangles. Its volume $V$ is obtained by adding the volume of a regular dodecahedron and a pentagonal pyramid, as suggested by the construction:
$$\begin{align}
A &= 11 \cdot \frac{{\sqrt {25 + 10\sqrt 5} }}{4}a^2 + 5 \cdot \frac{\sqrt{3}}{4}a^2 \approx 21.09a^2, \\
V &= \frac{15 + 7\sqrt{5}}{4}a^3 + \frac{5 + \sqrt{5}}{24} a^3 \approx 7.965a^3.
\end{align}$$
