= Revue Archéologique =

Scientific journal

Revue archéologique, published in Paris, is one of the oldest, longest-running scientific journals. First appearing in 1844, it is neither the organ of an institution nor of any school, but has complete independence, under the guidance of its current editor, Marie-Christine Hellmann. Revue archéologique appears twice annually.

Its center of interest has remained Classical Antiquity since its origins, but its sphere of interest extends beyond, to the Ancient Near East, Anatolia, Etruscan Italy and Central Asia.
