= Ruth Kellerhals =

Swiss mathematician

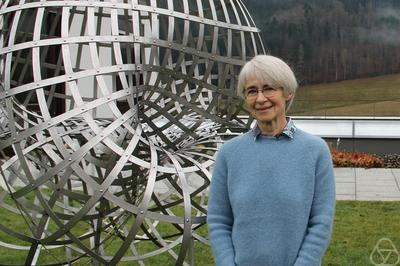
- Kellerhals at Oberwolfach in 2025
- Born: 17 July 1957 (age 69); Hägendorf, Switzerland
- Education: University of Basel
- Occupation: Mathematician
- Employer: University of Fribourg
- Known for: Hyperbolic geometry, Coxeter groups, polylogarithm identities

Ruth Kellerhals (born 17 July 1957) is a Swiss mathematician at the University of Fribourg, whose field of study is hyperbolic geometry, geometric group theory and polylogarithm identities.

== Biography ==
As a child, she went to a gymnasium in Basel and then studied at the University of Basel, graduating in 1982 with a diploma directed by Heinz Huber "On finiteness of the isometry group of a compact negatively curved Riemannian manifold". She received her PhD in 1988, from the same university, with a thesis entitled "On the volumes of hyperbolic polytopes in dimensions three and four". Her advisor was Hans-Christoph Im Hof. During the year 1983–84 she also studied at the University of Grenoble (Fourier Institute).

In 1995 she received her habilitation from the University of Bonn, where she worked at the Max Planck Institute for Mathematics since 1989 until 1995. There, she was an assistant with Professor Friedrich Hirzebruch. Since 1995 she has been an assistant professor at the University of Göttingen, and since 1999 a distinguished professor at the University of Bordeaux 1. In 2000 she became a professor at the University of Fribourg, Switzerland, where she was in 1998 to 1999 as a visiting professor.

== Research ==
Her main research fields include hyperbolic geometry, geometric group theory, geometry of discrete groups (especially reflection groups, Coxeter groups), convex and polyhedral geometry, volumes of hyperbolic polytopes, manifolds and polylogarithms. She does historical research into the works and life of Ludwig Schläfli, a Swiss geometer.

She has been a guest researcher at MSRI, IHES, Mittag-Leffler Institute, the State University of New York at Stony Brook, RIMS in Kyoto, Osaka City University, ETH Zürich, the University of Bern and the University of Auckland. Also she visited numerous research institutes and universities in Helsinki, Berlin and Budapest.

== Selected works ==
- Guglielmetti, Rafael; Jacquemet, Matthieu; Kellerhals, Ruth (2016). "On commensurable hyperbolic Coxeter groups". Geometriae Dedicata. 183: 143–167. doi:10.1007/s10711-016-0151-7.
- Kellerhals, Ruth; Kolpakov, Alexander (2014). "The minimal growth rate of cocompact Coxeter groups in hyperbolic 3-space". Canadian Journal of Mathematics. 66 (2): 354–372. doi:10.4153/CJM-2012-062-3.
- Kellerhals, Ruth (2012). "Scissors congruence, the golden ratio and volumes in hyperbolic 5-space". Discrete & Computational Geometry. 47 (3): 629–658. doi:10.1007/s00454-012-9397-5.
- Kellerhals, Ruth; Perren, Geneviève (2011). "On the growth of cocompact hyperbolic Coxeter groups". European Journal of Combinatorics. 32 (8): 1299–1316. arXiv:0910.4103. doi:10.1016/j.ejc.2011.03.020.
- Kellerhals, Ruth (2004). "On the structure of hyperbolic manifolds". Israel Journal of Mathematics. 143: 361–379. doi:10.1007/BF02803507. S2CID 119557013.
- Kellerhals, Ruth (1998). "Ball packings in spaces of constant curvature and the simplicial density function". Journal für die reine und angewandte Mathematik. 494: 189–203. doi:10.1515/crll.1998.006.
- Kellerhals, Ruth (1998). "Volumes of cusped hyperbolic manifolds". Topology. 37 (4): 719–734. doi:10.1016/S0040-9383(97)00052-9.
- Kellerhals, Ruth (1995). "Volumes in hyperbolic 5-space". Geometric and Functional Analysis. 5 (4): 640–667. doi:10.1007/BF01902056. S2CID 53356944.
- Kellerhals, Ruth (1992). "On the volumes of hyperbolic 5-orthoschemes and the trilogarithm". Commentarii Mathematici Helvetici. 67: 648–663. doi:10.1007/BF02566523. S2CID 120505581.
- Kellerhals, Ruth (1989). "On the volume of hyperbolic polyhedra". Mathematische Annalen. 285 (4): 541–569. doi:10.1007/BF01452047. S2CID 55942104.
