= List of small polyhedra by vertex count =

In geometry, a polyhedron is a solid in three dimensions with flat faces and straight edges. Every edge has exactly two faces, and every vertex is surrounded by alternating faces and edges. The smallest polyhedron is the tetrahedron with 4 triangular faces, 6 edges, and 4 vertices. Named polyhedra primarily come from the families of platonic solids, Archimedean solids, Catalan solids, and Johnson solids, as well as dihedral symmetry families including the pyramids, bipyramids, prisms, antiprisms, and trapezohedrons.

== Polyhedra by vertex count ==
Notes: Polyhedra with different names that are topologically identical are listed together. Except in the cases of four and five vertices, the lists below are by no means exhaustive of all possible polyhedra with the given number of vertices, but rather just include particularly simple/common/well-known/named examples. The "Counting Polyhedra" link below gives the exact number of distinct polyhedra with n vertices for small values of n.

4	Tetrahedron triangular pyramid					
5	Square pyramid	Triangular bipyramid				
6	Pentagonal pyramid	Octahedron (regular) triangular antiprism square bipyramid	Triangular prism wedge			
7	Hexagonal pyramid	Pentagonal bipyramid	Augmented triangular prism	Elongated triangular pyramid		
8	Heptagonal pyramid	Hexagonal bipyramid	Hexahedron; Cube; Square prism Cuboid; Rhombohedron; Trigonal trapezohedron	Square antiprism	Triakis tetrahedron	Elongated triangular bipyramid
8	Gyrobifastigium	Snub disphenoid	Biaugmented triangular prism			
9	Triangular cupola	Triaugmented triangular prism	Elongated square pyramid	Gyroelongated square pyramid	Tridiminished icosahedron	
9	Octagonal pyramid	Heptagonal bipyramid				
10	Nonagonal pyramid	Octagonal bipyramid	Pentagonal prism	Pentagonal antiprism	Gyroelongated square bipyramid	Elongated square bipyramid
10	Metabidiminished icosahedron	Augmented tridiminished icosahedron	Sphenocorona			
11	Decagonal pyramid	Nonagonal bipyramid	Augmented pentagonal prism	Elongated pentagonal pyramid	Gyroelongated pentagonal pyramid	Augmented sphenocorona
11	Octadecahedron					
12	Elongated pentagonal bipyramid	Truncated tetrahedron	Cuboctahedron	Square cupola	Triangular orthobicupola	Biaugmented pentagonal prism
12	Hendecagonal pyramid	Icosahedron	Decagonal bipyramid	Hexagonal prism	Hexagonal antiprism	Sphenomegacorona
13	Dodecagonal pyramid	Hendecagonal bipyramid	Augmented hexagonal prism			
14	Tridecagonal pyramid	Dodecagonal bipyramid	Elongated hexagonal dipyramid	Heptagonal prism	Heptagonal antiprism	Rhombic dodecahedron
14	Parabiaugmented hexagonal prism	Metabiaugmented hexagonal prism	Hebesphenomegacorona	Bilunabirotunda	Tetrakis hexahedron	
15	Tetradecagonal pyramid	Tridecagonal bipyramid	Pentagonal cupola	Elongated triangular cupola		
15	Gyroelongated triangular cupola					
16	Octagonal prism	Octagonal antiprism	Triaugmented hexagonal prism	Augmented truncated tetrahedron	Square orthobicupola	Square gyrobicupola
16	Disphenocingulum	Snub square antiprism				
17	Hexadecagonal pyramid	Pentadecagonal bipyramid				
18	Nonagonal prism	Enneagonal antiprism	Gyroelongated triangular bicupola	Elongated triangular orthobicupola	Elongated triangular gyrobicupola	rhombocuboctohedron
19
20	Dodecahedron	Pentagonal rotunda	Elongated square cupola	Gyroelongated square cupola	Pentagonal orthobicupola	Pentagonal gyrobicupola
20	Decagonal prism	Decagonal antiprism				
21	Augmented dodecahedron					
22	Parabiaugmented dodecahedron	Metabiaugmented dodecahedron				
23	Triaugmented dodecahedron					
24	Truncated cube	Truncated octahedron	Rhombicuboctahedron	Elongated square gyrobicupola	Gyroelongated square bicupola	Snub cube
