= Gyroelongated pentagonal pyramid =

11th Johnson solid (16 faces)

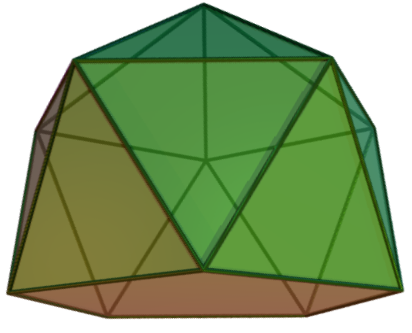
- Type: Johnson; J_{10} – J_{11} – J_{12}
- Faces: 15 triangles 1 pentagon
- Edges: 25
- Vertices: 11
- Vertex configuration: 5(3^{3}.5); 1+5(3^{5})
- Symmetry group: $C_{5 \mathrm{v}}$
- Properties: composite, convex

Net
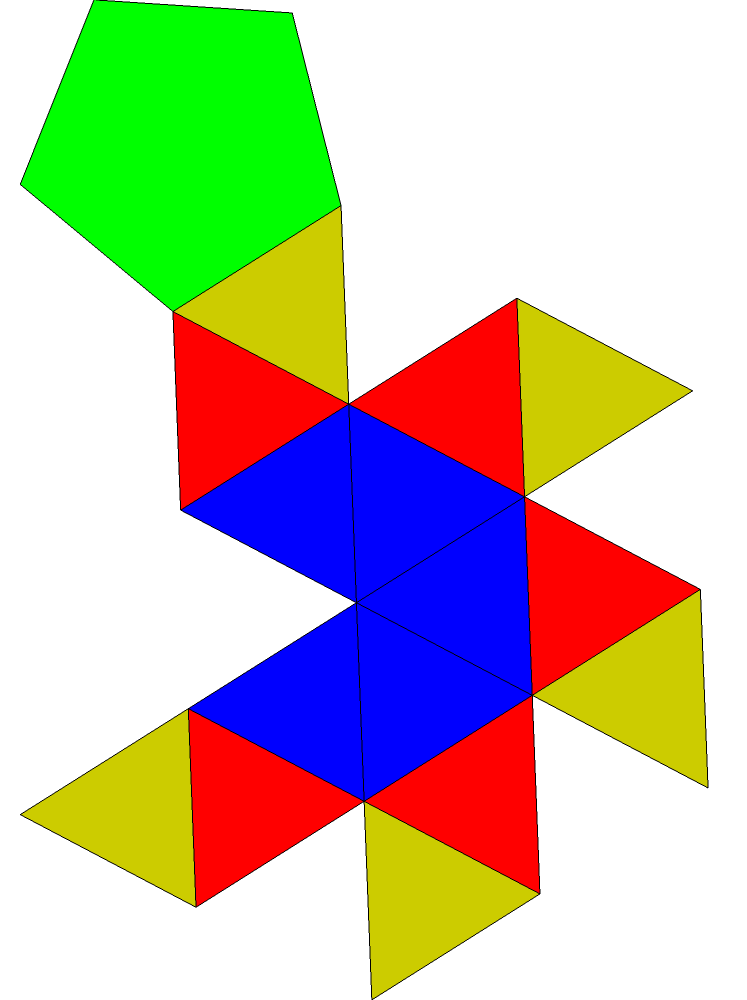

3D model of a gyroelongated pentagonal pyramid

In geometry, the gyroelongated pentagonal pyramid is a polyhedron constructed by attaching a pentagonal antiprism to the base of a pentagonal pyramid. An alternative name is diminished icosahedron because it can be constructed by removing a pentagonal pyramid from a regular icosahedron.

== Construction ==
The gyroelongated pentagonal pyramid can be constructed from a pentagonal antiprism by attaching a pentagonal pyramid onto its pentagonal face. This pyramid covers the pentagonal faces, so the resulting polyhedron has 15 equilateral triangles and 1 regular pentagon as its faces. Another way to construct it is started from the regular icosahedron by cutting off one of two pentagonal pyramids, a process known as diminishment; for this reason, it is also called the diminished icosahedron. Because the resulting polyhedron has the property of convexity and its faces are regular polygons, the gyroelongated pentagonal pyramid is a Johnson solid, enumerated as the 11th Johnson solid $J_{11}$. It is an example of composite polyhedron.

== Properties ==
The surface area of a gyroelongated pentagonal pyramid $A$ can be obtained by summing the area of 15 equilateral triangles and 1 regular pentagon. Its volume $V$ can be ascertained either by slicing it off into both a pentagonal antiprism and a pentagonal pyramid, after which adding them up; or by subtracting the volume of a regular icosahedron to a pentagonal pyramid. With edge length $a$, they are:
$$\begin{align}
A &= \frac{15 \sqrt{3} + \sqrt{5(5 + 2\sqrt{5})}}{4}a^2 \approx 8.215a^2, \\
V &= \frac{25 + 9\sqrt{5}}{24}a^3 \approx 1.880a^3.
\end{align}$$

It has the same three-dimensional symmetry group as the pentagonal pyramid: the cyclic group $C_{5 \mathrm{v}}$ of order 10. Its dihedral angle can be obtained by involving the angle of a pentagonal antiprism and pentagonal pyramid: its dihedral angle between triangle-to-pentagon is the pentagonal antiprism's angle between that 100.8°, and its dihedral angle between triangle-to-triangle is the pentagonal pyramid's angle 138.2°.

According to Steinitz's theorem, the skeleton of any convex polyhedron can be represented as a planar graph that is 3-vertex connected. A planar graph is one that can be drawn on a flat sheet with no edges crossing. A $k$-connected graph is one that remains connected whenever $k - 1$ vertices are removed. This graph is obtained by removing one of the icosahedral graph's vertices, leaving 11 vertices, an odd number, resulting in a graph with a perfect matching. Hence, the graph is a 2-vertex connected claw-free graph, an example of factor-critical.

== Appearance ==
The gyroelongated pentagonal pyramid has appeared in stereochemistry, wherein the shape resembles the molecular geometry known as capped pentagonal antiprism.

== See also ==
- Metabidiminished icosahedron
- Tridiminished icosahedron
