= Triangular bipyramid =

Two tetrahedra joined by one face

- Type: Bipyramid; Deltahedra; Johnson; J_{11} – J_{12} – J_{13} Simplicial
- Faces: 6 triangles
- Edges: 9
- Vertices: 5
- Vertex configuration: $2 \times (3^3) + 3 \times (3^4)$
- Symmetry group: $D_{3 \mathrm{h}}$
- Dihedral angle (degrees): As a Johnson solid: triangle-to-triangle: 70.5°; triangle-to-triangle if tetrahedra are being attached: 141.1°
- Dual polyhedron: triangular prism
- Properties: convex, composite (Johnson solid), face-transitive

A triangular bipyramid is a hexahedron, a polyhedron with six triangular faces. It is constructed by attaching two tetrahedra face-to-face. The same shape is also known as a triangular dipyramid or trigonal bipyramid. If these tetrahedra are regular, all faces of a triangular bipyramid are equilateral. It is an example of a deltahedron, composite polyhedron, and Johnson solid.

Many polyhedra are related to the triangular bipyramid, such as similar shapes derived from different approaches and the triangular prism as its dual polyhedron. Applications of a triangular bipyramid include trigonal bipyramidal molecular geometry, which describes its atom cluster, a solution of the Thomson problem, and the representation of color order systems by the eighteenth century.

== Special cases ==
=== As a right bipyramid ===
Like other bipyramids, a triangular bipyramid can be constructed by attaching two tetrahedra face-to-face. These tetrahedra cover their triangular base, and the resulting polyhedron has six triangles, five vertices, and nine edges. Because of its triangular faces with any type, the triangular bipyramid is a simplicial polyhedron like other infinitely many bipyramids. A right bipyramid is one in which the apices of both pyramids are on a line passing through the center of the base, such that its faces are isosceles triangles. If two tetrahedra are otherwise, the triangular bipyramid is oblique.

Graph of a triangular bipyramid

According to Steinitz's theorem, a graph can be represented as the skeleton of a polyhedron if it is a planar (can be drawn without crossing any edges) and three-connected graph (it remains connected if any two vertices are removed). A triangular bipyramid is represented by a graph with nine edges, constructed by adding one vertex to the vertices of a wheel graph representing tetrahedra.

Like other right bipyramids, a triangular bipyramid has three-dimensional point-group symmetry, the dihedral group $D_{3 \mathrm{h}}$ of order twelve: the appearance of a triangular bipyramid is unchanged as it rotated by one-, two-thirds, and full angle around the axis of symmetry (a line passing through two vertices and the base's center vertically), and it has mirror symmetry with any bisector of the base; it is also symmetrical by reflection across a horizontal plane. A triangular bipyramid is face-transitive (or isohedral).

=== As a Johnson solid ===
Triangular bipyramid with regular faces alongside its net

3D model of a triangular bipyramid as a Johnson solid

If the tetrahedra are regular, all edges of a triangular bipyramid are equal in length and form equilateral triangular faces. A polyhedron with only equilateral triangles as faces is called a deltahedron. There are eight convex deltahedra, one of which is a triangular bipyramid with regular polygonal faces. A convex polyhedron in which all of its faces are regular polygons is a Johnson solid. A triangular bipyramid with regular faces is numbered as the twelfth Johnson solid $J_{12}$. It is an example of a composite polyhedron, because it can be sliced, by a plane intersecting it only in edges, into two regular tetrahedra.

A triangular bipyramid's surface area $A$ is six times that of each triangle. Its volume $V$ can be calculated by slicing it into two tetrahedra and adding their volume. In the case of edge length $a$, this is:
$$\begin{align}
A &= \frac{3\sqrt{3}}{2}a^2 &\approx 2.598a^2, \\
V &= \frac{\sqrt{2}}{6}a^3 &\approx 0.238a^3.
\end{align}$$

The dihedral angle of a triangular bipyramid can be obtained by adding the dihedral angle of two regular tetrahedra. The dihedral angle of a triangular bipyramid between adjacent triangular faces is that of the regular tetrahedron: 70.5 degrees. In an edge where two tetrahedra are attached, the dihedral angle of adjacent triangles is twice that: 141.1 degrees.

== Related polyhedra ==
The Kleetope of a triangular bipyramid is obtained by augmenting a triangular bipyramid with tetrahedra on each face.

Some types of triangular bipyramids may be derived in different ways. The Kleetope of a triangular bipyramid, its Kleetope can be constructed from a triangular bipyramid by attaching tetrahedra to each of its faces, replacing them with three other triangles; the skeleton of the resulting polyhedron represents the Goldner–Harary graph. Another type of triangular bipyramid results from cutting off its vertices, a process known as truncation.

Bipyramids are the dual polyhedron of prisms. This means the bipyramids' vertices correspond to the faces of a prism, and the edges between pairs of vertices of one correspond to the edges between pairs of faces of the other; doubling it results in the original polyhedron. A triangular bipyramid is the dual polyhedron of a triangular prism, and vice versa. A triangular prism has five faces, nine edges, and six vertices, with the same symmetry as a triangular bipyramid.

== Applications ==
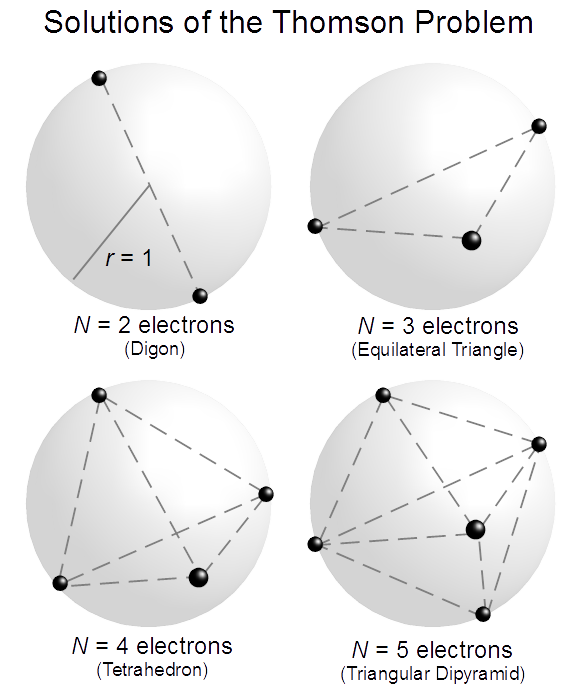
The known solution of the Thomson problem, with one a triangular bipyramid

The Thomson problem concerns the minimum energy configuration of charged particles on a sphere. A triangular bipyramid is a known solution in the case of five electrons, placing vertices of a triangular bipyramid within a sphere. This solution is aided by a mathematically rigorous computer.

A chemical compound's trigonal bipyramidal molecular geometry may be described as the atom cluster of a triangular bipyramid. This molecule has a main-group element without an active lone pair, described by a model which predicts the geometry of molecules known as VSEPR theory. Examples of this structure include phosphorus pentafluoride and phosphorus pentachloride in the gaseous phase.

In color theory, the triangular bipyramid was used to represent the three-dimensional color-order system in primary colors. German astronomer Tobias Mayer wrote in 1758 that each of its vertices represents a color: white and black are the top and bottom axial vertices, respectively, and the rest of the vertices are red, blue, and yellow.
