= Pentagonal bipyramid =

Two pentagonal pyramids fused base-to-base

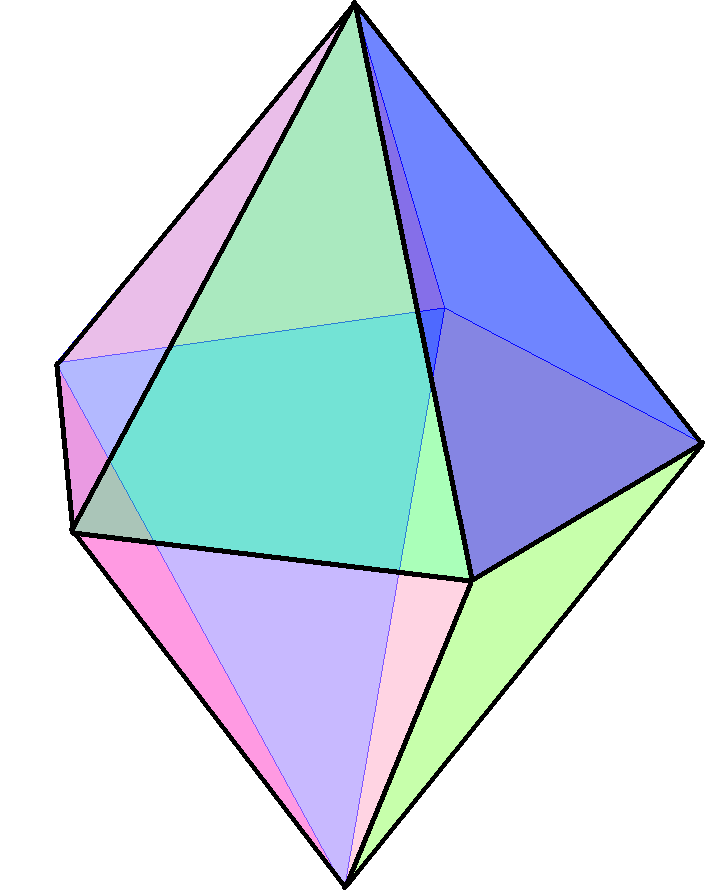
- A pentagonal bipyramid with two identical right pyramids attached base-to-base
- Type: Bipyramid, Deltahedra; Johnson; J_{12} – J_{13} – J_{14} Simplicial
- Faces: 10 triangles
- Edges: 15
- Vertices: 7
- Vertex configuration: $5 \times (3^4) + 2 \times (3^5)$
- Symmetry group: $D_{5 \mathrm{h}}$
- Dihedral angle (degrees): As a Johnson solid: triangle-to-triangle: 138.2°; triangle-to-triangle if pyramids being attached base-to-base: 74.8°
- Dual polyhedron: pentagonal prism
- Properties: convex, composite (as a Johnson solid), face-transitive

A pentagonal bipyramid or pentagonal dipyramid is a polyhedron with ten triangular faces. It is constructed by attaching two pentagonal pyramids to each of their bases. If the triangular faces are equilateral, the pentagonal bipyramid is an example of deltahedra, composite polyhedron, and Johnson solid. Regardless of any type of its triangular faces, the pentagonal bipyramid is a simplicial polyhedron like any other bipyramid.

The vertices and edges of a pentagonal bipyramid can give rise to a graph. It is one of the four four-connected simplicial well-covered graphs. It is also one of the six connected graphs in which its neighborhood of every vertex is a cycle of length four or five. Within this structure, the graph forms a topological surface called a Whitney triangulation.

The pentagonal bipyramid has applications in many fields. In chemistry, the pentagonal bipyramidal molecular geometry is a description of an atom cluster resembling a pentagonal bipyramid. In mathematical optimization, the pentagonal bipyramid is a solution for Thomson problem. In mineralogy, it can also be found in decahedral nanoparticles.

== Special cases ==
=== As a right bipyramid ===
The pentagonal bipyramid can be constructed by attaching the bases of two pentagonal pyramids. These pyramids cover their pentagonal base, such that the resulting polyhedron has ten triangles as its faces, fifteen edges, and seven vertices. Because of its triangular faces with any type, the pentagonal bipyramid is a simplicial polyhedron like other infinitely many bipyramids. The pentagonal bipyramid is said to be right if two pyramids are identical. This means that the pyramids are symmetrically regular, and their apices are on the line passing through the base's center. Like any right bipyramid, its faces become isosceles triangles. Two pyramids that are otherwise result in a bipyramid with oblique form.

The right pentagonal bipyramid is face-transitive or isohedral, meaning any mapping of two adjacent faces preserves its symmetrical appearance by either the transformations of translations, rotations, or reflections. This relates to the fact that it has three-dimensional symmetry group of dihedral group $D_{5\mathrm{h}}$ of order twenty: having five-fold symmetry that is rotation of one- up to four-fifth around the axis of symmetry passing through apices and base's center vertically, mirror symmetry relative to any bisector of the base, and reflection across a horizontal plane.

=== As a Johnson solid ===
Pentagonal bipyramid with regular faces, alongside its net.

3D model of a pentagonal bipyramid as a Johnson solid

The pentagonal bipyramid is one of the eight convex deltahedra if the faces of two pyramids are equilateral triangles and all edges are of equal length. It is an example of a composite polyhedron by slicing it into two regular-faced pentagonal pyramids with a plane until those pyramids cannot be sliced into more convex, regular-faced polyhedra again. Because its faces are regular polygons, such a pentagonal bipyramid is generally a Johnson solid; every convex deltahedron is a Johnson solid. There are 92 Johnson solids, wherein the pentagonal bipyramid is designated in the enumeration of the thirteenth Johnson solid $J_{13}$.

A pentagonal bipyramid's surface area $A$ is ten times that of all triangles, and its volume $V$ can be ascertained by twice the volume of a pentagonal pyramid. In the case of edge length $a$, where all edges are equal in length, the formulations are:
$$A = \frac{5\sqrt{3}}{2}a^2 \approx 4.3301a^2, \qquad V = \frac{5 + \sqrt{5}}{12}a^3 \approx 0.603a^3.$$

The dihedral angle of a regular-faced pentagonal bipyramid can be calculated by adding the angle of pentagonal pyramids:

- the dihedral angle of a pentagonal bipyramid between two adjacent triangles is that of a pentagonal pyramid, approximately 138.2°, and
- the dihedral angle of a pentagonal bipyramid with regular faces between two adjacent triangular faces, on the edge where two pyramids are attached, is 74.8°, obtained by summing the dihedral angle of a pentagonal pyramid between the triangular face and the base.

The pentagonal bipyramid has one type of closed geodesic, the path on the surface avoiding the vertices and locally looks like the shortest path. In other words, this path follows straight line segments across each face that intersect, creating complementary angles on the two incident faces of the edge as they cross. The closed geodesic crosses the apical and equator edges of a pentagonal bipyramid, with the length of $2\sqrt{3} \approx 3.46$.

== Graph ==
Graph of a pentagonal bipyramid. In the illustration, the yellow vertices are the apices of a bipyramid.

Like any bipyramid, the vertices and edges of a pentagonal bipyramid can give rise to a graph. This is due to Steinitz's theorem, stating that the edges of any convex polyhedron can have a planar graph which is 3-connected. Being planar means that the edges cannot cross each other, and being $k$-connected means that the graph remains its connectivity whenever $k-1$ vertices are removed.

As a four-connected simplicial, the graph of a pentagonal bipyramid is well-covered, meaning that all of the maximal independent sets of its vertices have the same size (i.e., the same number of edges). Such a property is also possessed by other four-connected simplicial graphs like the regular octahedron, the snub disphenoid, and an irregular polyhedron with twelve vertices and twenty triangular faces.

The graph of a pentagonal bipyramid is one of only six connected graphs in which the neighborhood of every vertex is a cycle of length four or five; the others being the Fritsch graph, the octahedral graph, the icosahedral graph, and the edge graphs of the snub disphenoid and the gyroelongated square bipyramid. More generally, when every vertex in a graph has a cycle of length at least four as its neighborhood, the triangles of the graph automatically link up to form a topological surface called a Whitney triangulation. These six graphs come from the six Whitney triangulations that, when their triangles are equilateral, have positive angular defect at every vertex. This makes them a combinatorial analogue of the positively curved smooth surfaces. They come from six of the eight deltahedra—excluding the two that have a vertex with a triangular neighborhood.

== Related polyhedra ==
The dual polyhedron of a pentagonal bipyramid is the pentagonal prism. More generally, every bipyramid is dual to a prism. The pentagonal prism has two pentagonal faces as its base, where these bases produce five rectangular faces by connecting a pair of vertices with an edge.

Steffen's polyhedron is a flexible polyhedron with nine vertices, claimed to be the flexible polyhedron with the smallest number of vertices. Being flexible means that a polyhedron can be continuously changed while preserving the shape of its faces. Nevertheless, Gallet et al. (2024) in their preprint claimed the existence of a flexible polyhedron with eight vertices. They obtained it by combining two Bricard octahedra to form a self-crossing flexible pentagonal bipyramid, subsequently replacing one of its faces by three triangles to eliminate the self-crossing.

== Applications ==
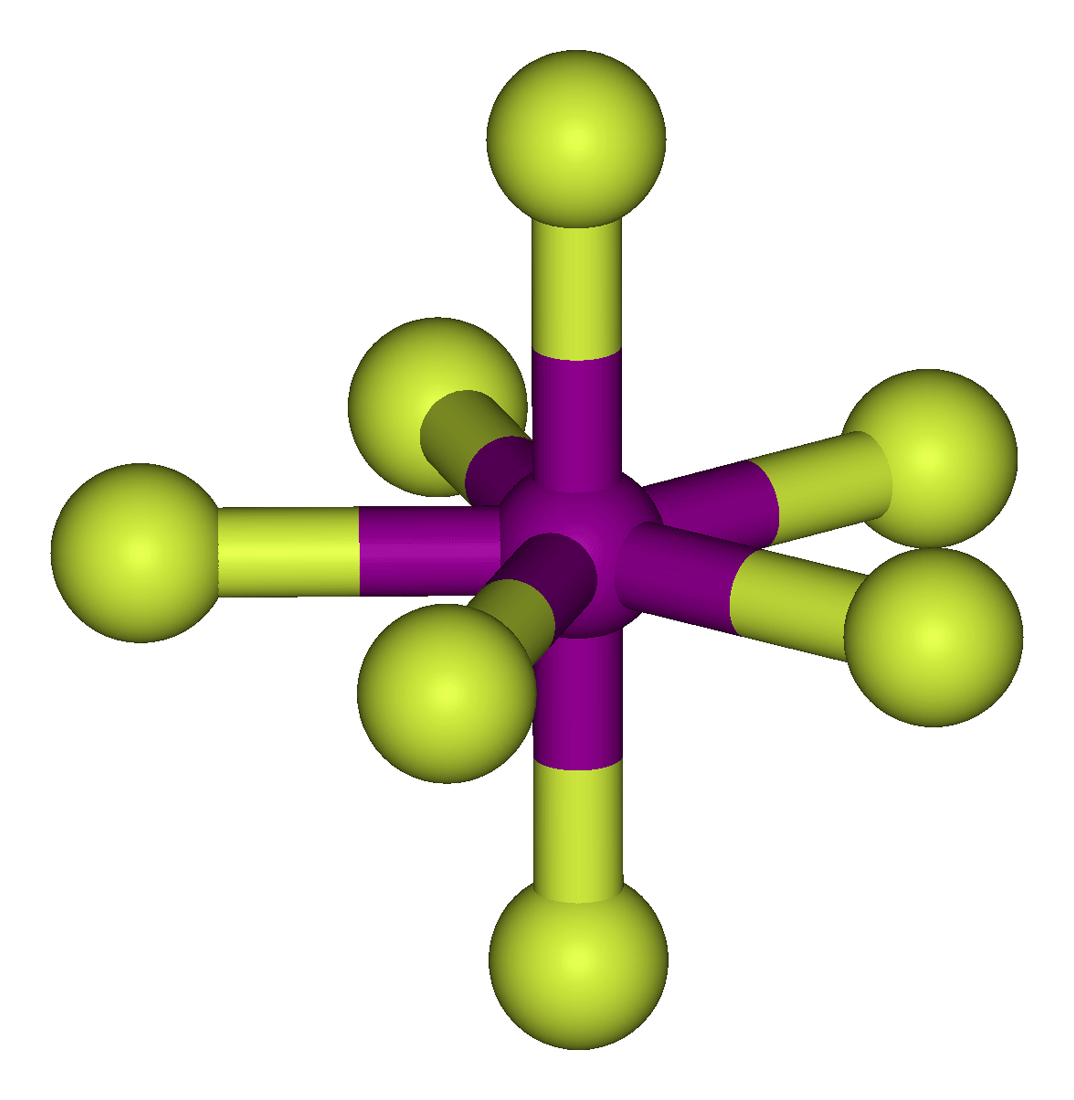
The ball-and-stick model of iodine heptafluoride, resembling a pentagonal bipyramid

In the geometry of chemical compounds, the pentagonal bipyramid can be the shape of an atom cluster surrounding an atom. The pentagonal bipyramidal molecular geometry describes clusters for which this polyhedron is a pentagonal bipyramid. An example of such a cluster is iodine heptafluoride in the gas phase.

The pentagonal bipyramid with equilateral triangular faces is a known solution of the seven-electron case of the Thomson problem, concerning the minimum-energy configuration of charged particles on a sphere. The solution is done by placing the vertices of a pentagonal bipyramid inscribed in a sphere.

In mineralogy, pentagonal bipyramids and related five-fold symmetrical shapes are found in decahedral nanoparticles, a type of twinned crystal that can be macroscopic in size.
