= Pentagonal pyramid =

Pyramid with a pentagon base

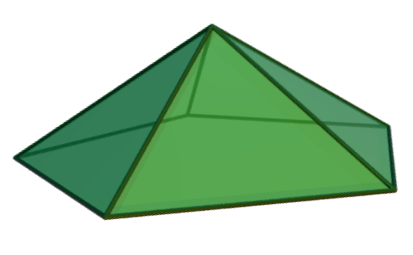
- Type: Pyramid; Johnson; J_{1} – J_{2} – J_{3}
- Faces: 5 triangles 1 pentagon
- Edges: 10
- Vertices: 6
- Vertex configuration: $5 \times (3^2 \times 5) + 1 \times 3^5$
- Symmetry group: $C_{5\mathrm{v}}$
- Dihedral angle (degrees): As a Johnson solid: triangle-to-triangle: 138.19°; triangle-to-pentagon: 37.37°
- Dual polyhedron: self-dual
- Properties: convex, elementary (Johnson solid)

Net

In geometry, a pentagonal pyramid is a pyramid with a pentagon base and five triangular faces, having a total of six faces. It is categorized as a Johnson solid if all of the edges are equal in length, forming equilateral triangular faces and a regular pentagonal base.

Pentagonal pyramids occur as pieces and tools in the construction of many polyhedra. They also appear in the field of natural science, as in stereochemistry where the shape can be described as the pentagonal pyramidal molecular geometry, as well as the study of shell assembling in the underlying potential energy surfaces and disclination in fivelings and related shapes such as pyramidal copper and other metal nanowires.

== Special cases ==
=== As a right pyramid ===
A pentagonal pyramid has six vertices, ten edges, and six faces. One of its faces is pentagon, a base of the pyramid; five others are triangles. Five of the edges make up the pentagon by connecting its five vertices, and the other five edges are known as the lateral edges of the pyramid, meeting at the sixth vertex called the apex. A pentagonal pyramid is said to be regular if its base is circumscribed in a circle that forms a regular pentagon, and it is said to be right if its altitude is erected perpendicularly to the base's center.

Like other right pyramids with a regular polygon as a base, this pyramid has pyramidal symmetry of cyclic group $C_{5\mathrm{v}}$: the pyramid is left invariant by rotations of one, two, three, four-fifths around its axis of symmetry, the line connecting the apex to the center of the base. It is also mirror symmetric relative to any perpendicular plane passing through a bisector of the base. It can be represented as the wheel graph $W_5$, meaning its skeleton can be interpreted as a pentagon in which its five vertices connects a vertex in the center called the universal vertex. It is self-dual, meaning its dual polyhedron is the pentagonal pyramid itself.

=== As a Johnson solid ===
3D model of a pentagonal pyramid with regular faces

When all edges are equal in length, the five triangular faces are equilateral and the base is a regular pentagon. Five equilateral triangles surround a common apex, and any two of them alongside a regular pentagon surround any vertex of the pentagonal base. The vertex configuration of such pyramid is therefore $1 \times (3^5) + 5 \times (3^2 \times 5)$. Since the faces are regular polygons, a pentagonal pyramid, it is classified as the second Johnson solid $J_2$, a set of 92 convex polyhedra with such faces, named after American mathematician Norman W. Johnson. There are two dihedral angles (angles that are formed by two adjecent faces): between two adjacent triangular faces is approximately 138.19° and between the triangular face and the base is 37.37°. It is an elementary polyhedron, meaning that it cannot be separated by a plane to create two small convex polyhedra with regular faces.

A polyhedron's surface area is the sum of the areas of its faces. Therefore, the surface area of a pentagonal pyramid is the sum of the areas of the five triangles and the one pentagon. The volume of every pyramid equals one-third of the area of its base multiplied by its height. So, the volume of a pentagonal pyramid is one-third of the product of the height and the pentagonal base area. In the case of Johnson solid with edge length $a$, its surface area $A$ and volume $V$ are:
$$\begin{align}
A &= \frac{a^2}{2}\sqrt{\frac{5}{2}\left(10+\sqrt{5}+\sqrt{75+30\sqrt{5}}\right)} \approx 3.88554a^2, \\
V &= \frac{5 + \sqrt{5}}{24} a^3 \approx 0.30150a^3.
\end{align}$$

The pentagonal pyramid, as a Johnson solid, can be constructed through Cartesian coordinate system, with the vertices
$$(\pm 1, 0, \phi), \quad (0, \pm \phi, 1), \quad (\phi, \pm 1, 0)$$
where $\phi = (1+\sqrt{5})/2$ is the golden ratio.

== Applications ==
Pentagonal pyramids can be found in a small stellated dodecahedron

Pentagonal pyramids can be found as components of many polyhedrons. Attaching its base to the pentagonal face of another polyhedron is an example of the construction process known as augmentation, and attaching it to prisms or antiprisms is known as elongation or gyroelongation, respectively. Examples of polyhedrons are the pentakis dodecahedron is constructed from the dodecahedron by attaching the base of pentagonal pyramids onto each pentagonal face, similar to the small stellated dodecahedron by stellation, and a regular icosahedron constructed from a pentagonal antiprism by attaching two pentagonal pyramids onto its pentagonal bases. Some Johnson solids are constructed by either augmenting pentagonal pyramids or augmenting other shapes with pentagonal pyramids: an elongated pentagonal pyramid $J_9$, a gyroelongated pentagonal pyramid $J_{11}$, a pentagonal bipyramid $J_{13}$, an elongated pentagonal bipyramid $J_{16}$, an augmented dodecahedron $J_{58}$, a parabiaugmented dodecahedron $J_{59}$, a metabiaugmented dodecahedron $J_{60}$, and a triaugmented dodecahedron $J_{61}$. Relatedly, the removal of a pentagonal pyramid from polyhedra is an example of a technique known as diminishment; the metabidiminished icosahedron $J_{62}$ and tridiminished icosahedron $J_{63}$ are the examples in which their constructions begin by removing pentagonal pyramids from a regular icosahedron.

In stereochemistry, an atom cluster can have a pentagonal pyramidal geometry. This molecule has a main-group element with one active lone pair of electrons, which can be described by a model that predicts the geometry of molecules known as VSEPR theory. An example of a molecule with this structure is nido-cage carbonate CB_{5}H_{9}.

The formation of virus shells, known as capsids, can be modeled from pieces shaped like pentagonal and hexagonal pyramids. These shapes were chosen to resemble those of the protein subunits of natural viruses. By appropriately choosing the attractive and repulsive forces between pyramids, they found that the pyramids could self-assemble into icosahedral shells reminiscent of those found in nature.

The relaxation of internal elastic stress fields due to disclinations in twinned copper particles. Such a shape is the pentagonal pyramid, which allows growth to a large size and preserves symmetry. This can be done by activating cathode by the process of initial crystal growth in the electrolyte, by the movement of aluminum and silicon oxides' abrasive particles.
