= Tridiminished icosahedron =

63rd Johnson solid (8 faces)

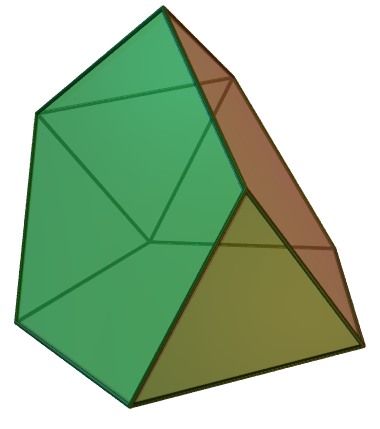
- Type: Johnson; J_{62} – J_{63} – J_{64}
- Faces: 5 triangles 3 pentagons
- Edges: 15
- Vertices: 9
- Vertex configuration: $2 \times 3 \times (3 \times 5^2) + 3 \times (3^3 \times 5)$
- Symmetry group: $C_{3 \mathrm{v}}$
- Properties: convex, non-composite

Net
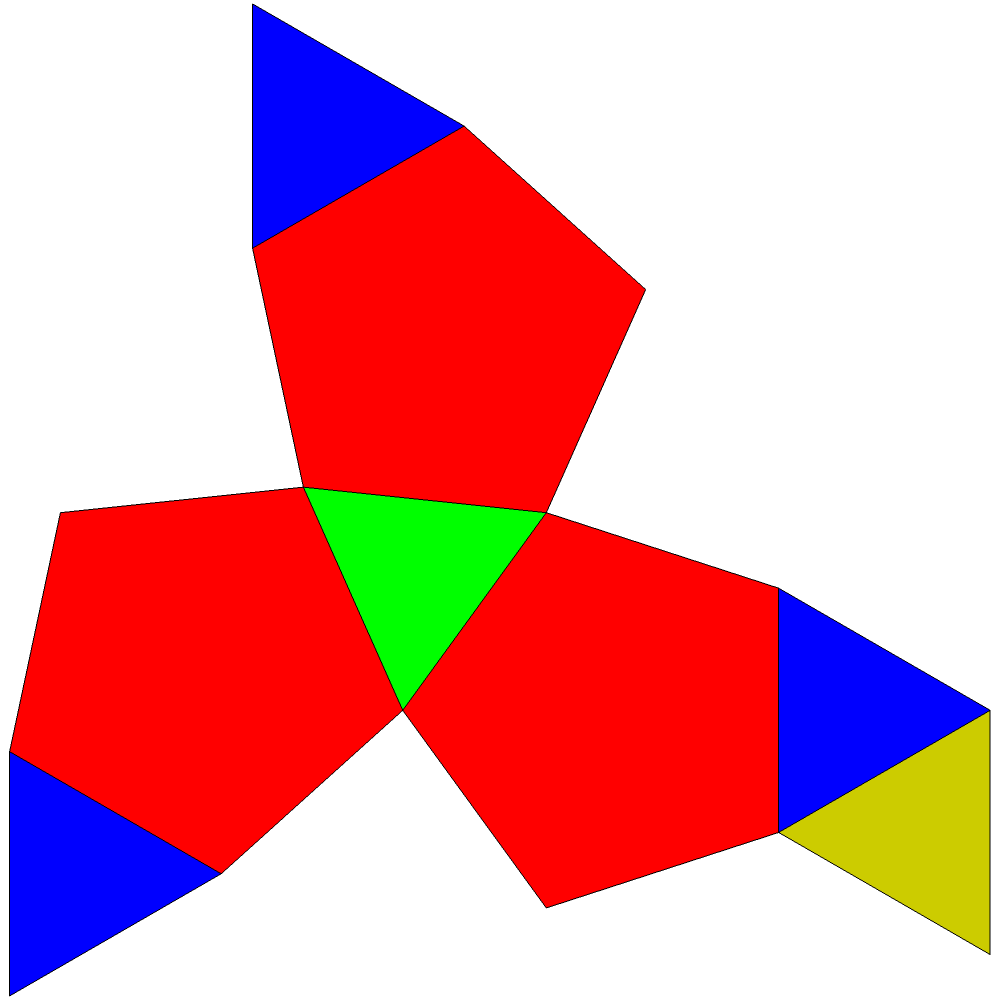

In geometry, the tridiminished icosahedron is a Johnson solid that is constructed by removing three pentagonal pyramids from a regular icosahedron.

3D model of a tridiminished icosahedron

== Construction ==
The tridiminished icosahedron can be constructed by removing three regular-faced pentagonal pyramid from a regular icosahedron. The aftereffect of such construction leaves five equilateral triangles and three regular pentagons. Since all of its faces are regular polygons and the resulting polyhedron remains convex, the tridiminished icosahedron is a Johnson solid, after American mathematician Norman W. Johnson who listed the 92 such polyhedra. It is enumerated as the sixty-third Johnson solid $J_{63}$. This construction is similar to other Johnson solids as in gyroelongated pentagonal pyramid and metabidiminished icosahedron.

One can construct the vertices of a tridiminished icosahedron with the following Cartesian coordinates:
$$(\pm 1, 0, \varphi), (1, 0, -\varphi), (\varphi, \pm 1, 0), (0, \varphi, 1), (-\varphi, -1, 0), (0, -\varphi, \pm 1),$$
where $\varphi = (1-\sqrt{5})/2$ is a golden ratio, obtained from the equation $\varphi^2 = \varphi + 1$.

The tridiminished icosahedron is a non-composite polyhedron. That is, no plane intersects its surface only in edges, so that it cannot be thereby divided into two or more convex, regular-faced polyhedra.

== Properties ==
The surface area of a tridiminished icosahedron $A$ is the sum of all polygonal faces' area: five equilateral triangles and three regular pentagons. Its volume $V$ can be ascertained by subtracting the volume of a regular icosahedron from the volume of three pentagonal pyramids. Given that $a$ is the edge length of a tridiminished icosahedron, they are:
$$\begin{align}
A &= \frac{5 \sqrt{3}+3 \sqrt{5 \left(5+2 \sqrt{5}\right)}}{4} a^2 &\approx 7.3265a^2, \\
V &= \frac{15 + 7 \sqrt{5}}{24}a^3 &\approx 1.2772a^3.
\end{align}$$

A tridiminished icosahedron has a three-dimensional symmetry group $C_{3\mathrm{v}}$ of order six. It has three kinds of dihedral angles. These angles are yielded in the following calculations.

- An angle between two adjacent triangles is around 138.1°, equal to that of a regular icosahedron and that of a pentagonal pyramid.
- A triangle-to-pentagon angle is around 100.8°. The result is obtained by subtracting the pentagon-to-triangle angle of a pentagonal pyramid from the triangle-to-triangle angle of a regular icosahedron.
- An angle between two adjacent pentagons is around 63.4°. The result is obtained by subtracting the pentagon-to-triangle angle of a pentagonal pyramid from the tridiminished icosahedron's triangle-to-pentagon angle.

== As a vertex figure ==
The tridiminished icosahedron is a vertex figure of a snub 24-cell, a four-dimensional polytope consisting of 120 regular tetrahedra and 24 icosahedra as the cells.

== See also ==
- Augmented tridiminished icosahedron, a Johnson solid by attaching a tetrahedron from a tridiminished icosahedron
