= Augmented tridiminished icosahedron =

64th Johnson solid (10 faces)

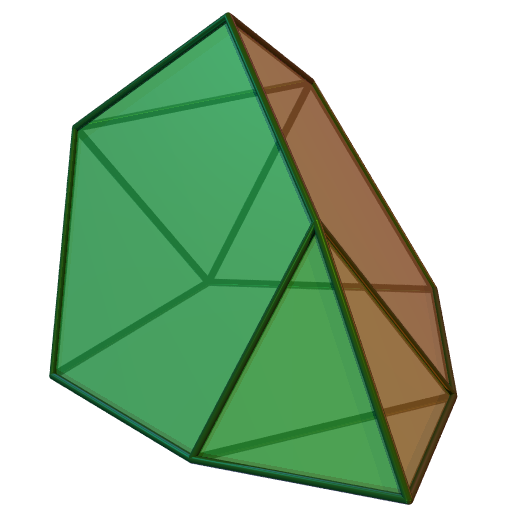
- Type: Johnson; J_{63} – J_{64} – J_{65}
- Faces: 1+2×3 triangles 3 pentagons
- Edges: 18
- Vertices: 10
- Vertex configuration: 1(3^{3}); 3(3.5^{2}); 3(3^{3}.5); 3(3^{2}.5^{2})
- Symmetry group: C_{3v}
- Dual polyhedron: -
- Properties: convex

Net
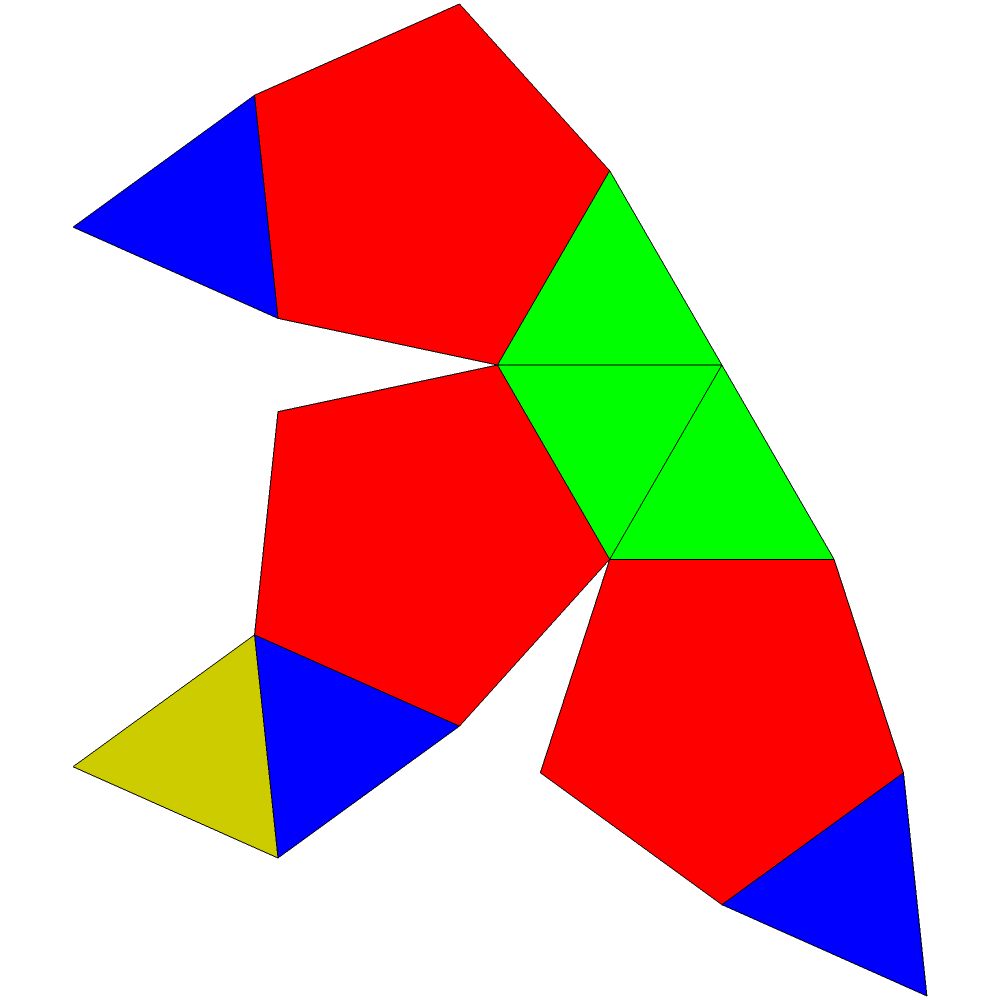

In geometry, the augmented tridiminished icosahedron is a composite convex polyhedron with regular faces, a Johnson solid. It can be obtained by joining a regular tetrahedron to another Johnson solid, the tridiminished icosahedron. The resulting polyhedron has seven equilateral triangular and three regular pentagonal faces. It is the only Johnson solid constructed with augmentation and diminishment. Out of 92 solids, the augmented tridiminished icosahedron is listed as 64th Johnson solid $J_{64}$.

3D model of an augmented tridiminished icosahedron

The surface area of an augmented tridiminished icosahedron is the sum of the area of seven equilateral triangles and three regular pentagons. Its volume can be obtained by summing the volume of a tridiminished icosahedron and a regular tetrahedron. Let $a$ be its edge length. Then its surface area $A$ and volume $V$ are:
$$\begin{align}
A &= \frac{7\sqrt{3}}{4}a^2 + \frac{\sqrt{25 + 10\sqrt{5}}}{4}a^2 \approx 4.751a^2 \\
V &= \frac{15 + 7 \sqrt{5}}{24}a^3 + \frac{\sqrt{2}}{12}a^3 \approx 1.395a^3.
\end{align}$$
