= Augmented truncated tetrahedron =

65th Johnson solid (14 faces)

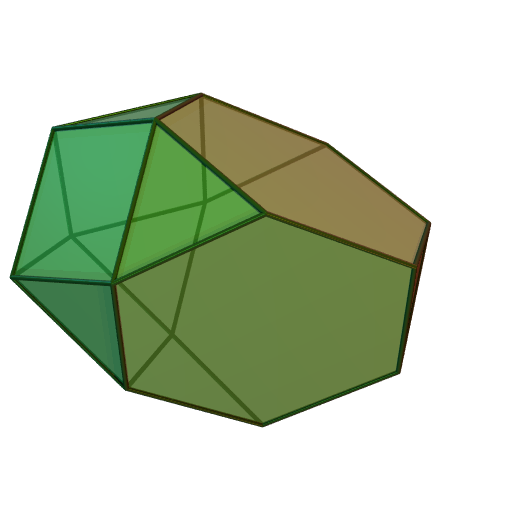
- Type: Johnson; J_{64} – J_{65} – J_{66}
- Faces: 8 triangles 3 squares 3 hexagons
- Edges: 27
- Vertices: 15
- Vertex configuration: 2×3(3.6^{2}); 3(3.4.3.4); 6(3.4.3.6)
- Symmetry group: C_{3v}
- Properties: convex

Net
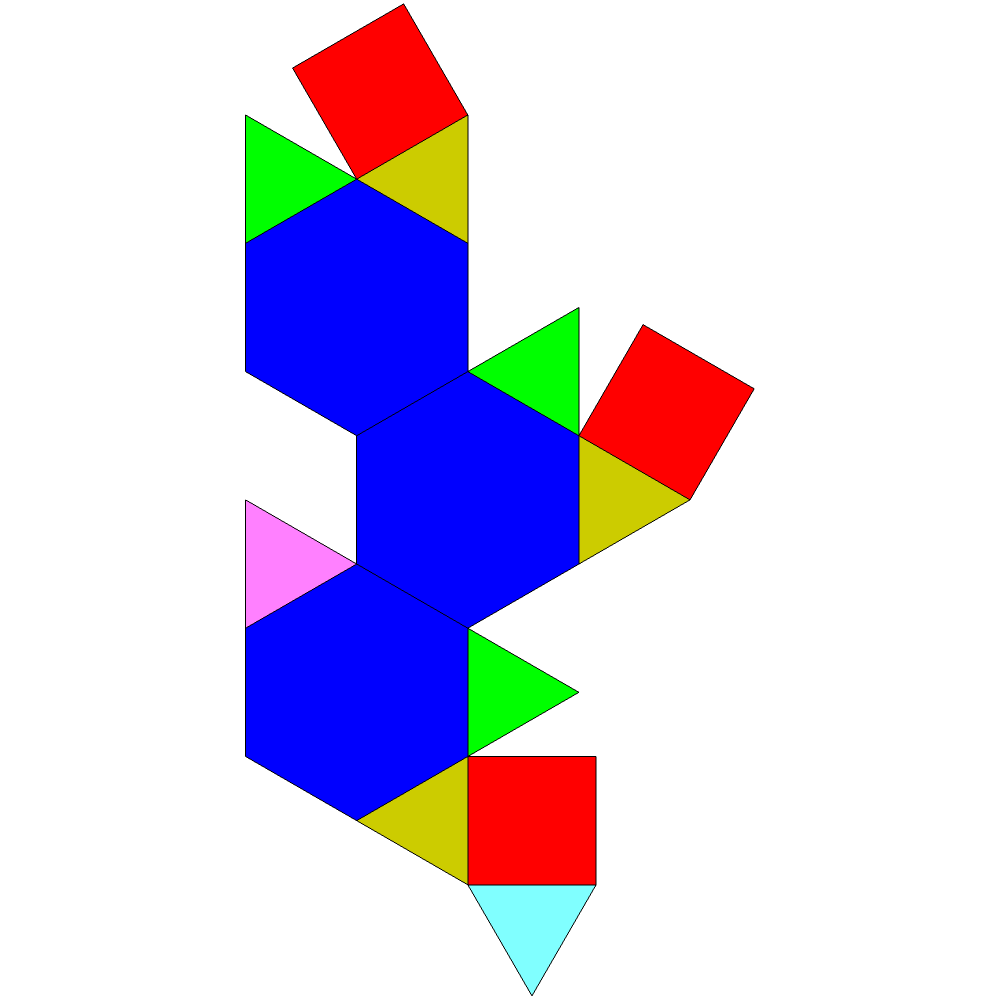

3D model of an augmented truncated tetrahedron

In geometry, the augmented truncated tetrahedron is a polyhedron constructed by attaching a triangular cupola onto a truncated tetrahedron. It is an example of a Johnson solid. Out of 19 modified Archimedean solids, it is the only one created by augmenting the truncated tetrahedron.

== Construction ==
The augmented truncated tetrahedron is constructed from a truncated tetrahedron by attaching a triangular cupola. This cupola covers one of the truncated tetrahedron's four hexagonal faces, so that the resulting polyhedron's faces are eight equilateral triangles, three squares, and three regular hexagons. Since it has the property of convexity and has regular polygonal faces, the augmented truncated tetrahedron is a Johnson solid, denoted as the sixty-fifth Johnson solid $J_{65}$.

== Properties ==
The surface area of an augmented truncated tetrahedron is:
$$\frac{6 + 13 \sqrt{3}}{2}a^2 \approx 14.258a^2,$$
the sum of the areas of its faces. Its volume can be calculated by slicing it off into both truncated tetrahedron and triangular cupola, and adding their volume:
$$\frac{11 \sqrt{2}}{4}a^3 \approx 3.889a^3.$$

It has the same three-dimensional symmetry group as the triangular cupola, the pyramidal symmetry $C_{3 \mathrm{v}}$. Its dihedral angles can be obtained by adding the angle of a triangular cupola and an augmented truncated tetrahedron in the following:

- its dihedral angle between triangle and hexagon is as in the truncated tetrahedron: 109.47°;
- its dihedral angle between adjacent hexagons is as in the truncated tetrahedron: 70.53°;
- its dihedral angle between triangle and square is as in the triangular cupola's angle: 125.3°
- its dihedral angle between triangle and square, on the edge where the triangular cupola and truncated tetrahedron are attached, is the sum of both triangular cupola's square-hexagon angle and the truncated tetrahedron's triangle-hexagon angle: approximately 164.17°; and
- its dihedral angle between triangle and hexagon, on the edge where triangular cupola and truncated tetrahedron are attached, is the sum of the dihedral angle of a triangular cupola and truncated tetrahedron between that: approximately 141.3°;
