= Pyramid (geometry) =

Conic solid with a polygonal base

A pyramid is a polyhedron formed by connecting a polygonal base and a point, called the apex. Each base edge and apex form a triangle, called a lateral face. A pyramid is a conic solid with a polygonal base.

A pyramid can be generalized into higher dimensions, known as hyperpyramid. All pyramids are self-dual.

== Definition ==
Parts of a pyramid

A pyramid is a polyhedron that may be formed by connecting each vertex in a planar polygon to a point lying outside that plane. This point is called the pyramid's apex, and the planar polygon is the pyramid's base. Each other face of the pyramid is a triangle consisting of one of the base's edges, and the two edges connecting that edge's endpoints to the apex. These faces are called the pyramid's lateral faces, and each edge connected to the apex is called a lateral edge. Historically, the definition of a pyramid has been described by many mathematicians in ancient times. Euclides in his Elements defined a pyramid as a solid figure, constructed from one plane to one point. The context of his definition was vague until Heron of Alexandria defined it as the figure by putting the point together with a polygonal base.

A prismatoid is defined as a polyhedron where its vertices lie on two parallel planes, with its lateral faces as triangles, trapezoids, and parallelograms. Pyramids are classified as prismatoid.

== Classification and types ==
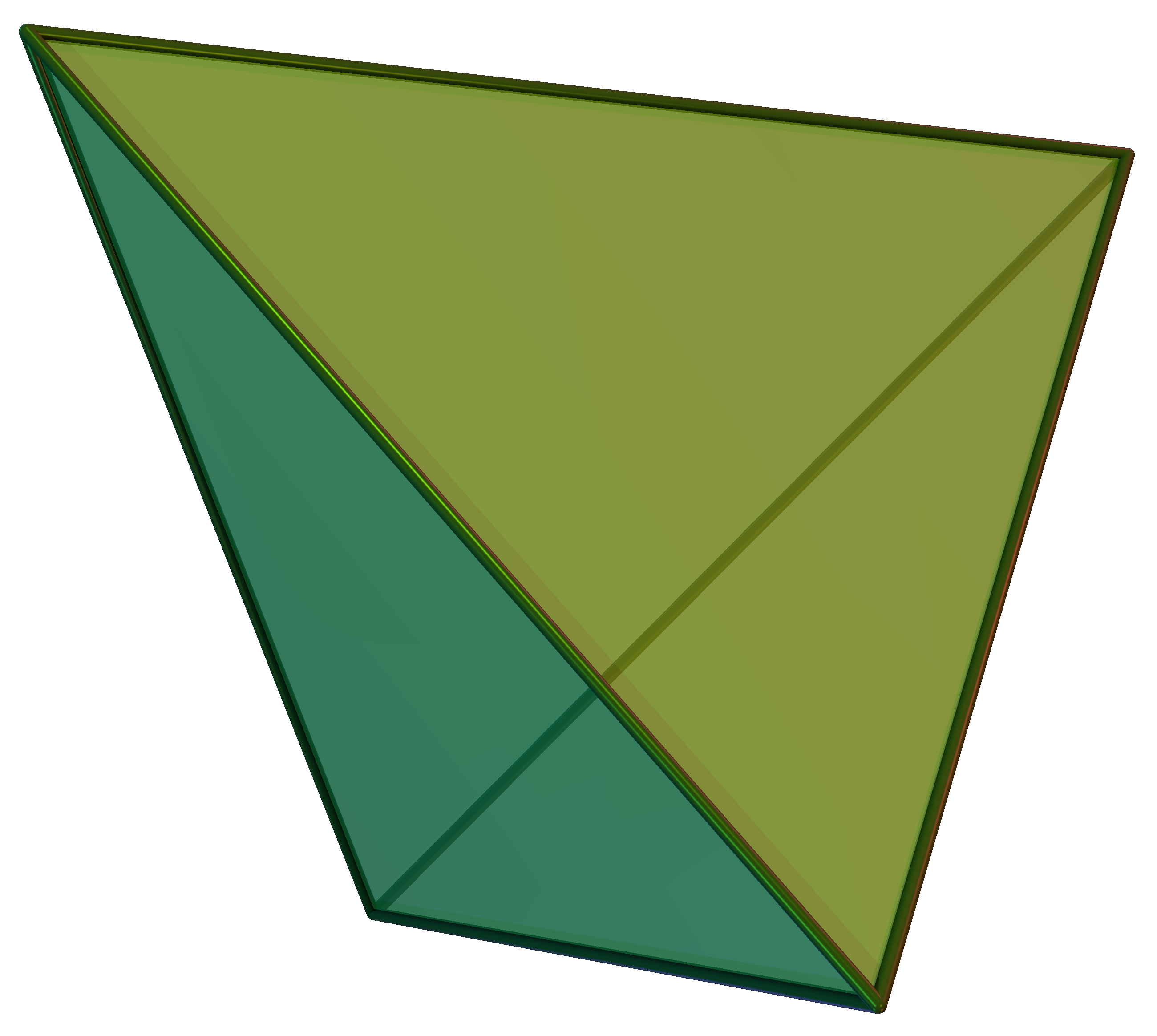
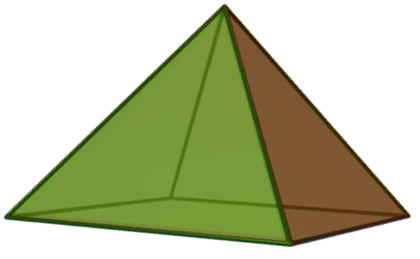
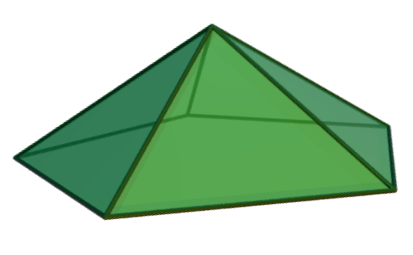
The family of a regular polygonal base pyramid: tetrahedron, square pyramid, pentagonal pyramid, and hexagonal pyramid.

The terms "right pyramid" and "regular pyramid" are used to describe special cases of pyramids. Their common notions are as follows. A regular pyramid is one with a regular polygon as its base. A right pyramid is one where the axis (the line joining the centroid of the base and the apex) is perpendicular to the base. An oblique pyramid is one where the axis is not perpendicular to the base. However, there are no standard definitions for these terms, and different sources use them somewhat differently.

Some sources define the term "right pyramid" only as a special case for regular pyramids, while others define it for the general case of any shape of a base. Other sources define only the term "right pyramid" to include within its definition the regular base. Rarely, a "right pyramid" is defined to be a pyramid whose base is circumscribed about a circle and the altitude of the pyramid meets the base at the circle's center.

For the pyramid with an n-sided regular base, it has n + 1 vertices, n + 1 faces, and 2n edges. Such pyramid has isosceles triangles as its faces, with its symmetry is C_{nv}, a symmetry of order 2n: the pyramids are symmetrical as they rotated around their axis of symmetry (a line passing through the apex and the base centroid), and they are mirror symmetric relative to any perpendicular plane passing through a bisector of the base. Examples are square pyramid and pentagonal pyramid, a four- and five-triangular faces pyramid with a square and pentagon base, respectively; they are classified as the first and second Johnson solid if their regular faces and edges that are equal in length, and their symmetries are C_{4v} of order 8 and C_{5v} of order 10, respectively. A tetrahedron or triangular pyramid is an example that has four triangles. If the edges are all equal in length, such that its faces are equilateral, and one of them is considered as the base, it is known as a regular tetrahedron, an example of a Platonic solid and deltahedra, and it has tetrahedral symmetry. A pyramid with the base as circle is known as cone.

Pyramids have the property of self-dual, meaning their duals are the same as vertices corresponding to the edges and vice versa. Their skeleton may be represented as the wheel graph, that is they can be depicted as a polygon in which its vertices connect a vertex in the center called the universal vertex.

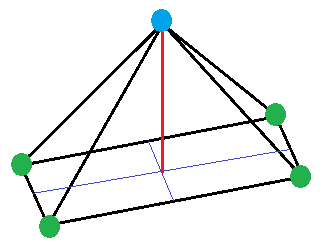
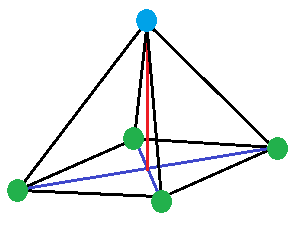
Pyramids with rectangular and rhombic bases

A right pyramid may also have a base with an irregular polygon. Examples of irregular pyramids are those with rectangle and rhombus as their bases. These two pyramids have the symmetry of C_{2v} of order 4.

A pyramid truncated by an inclined plane

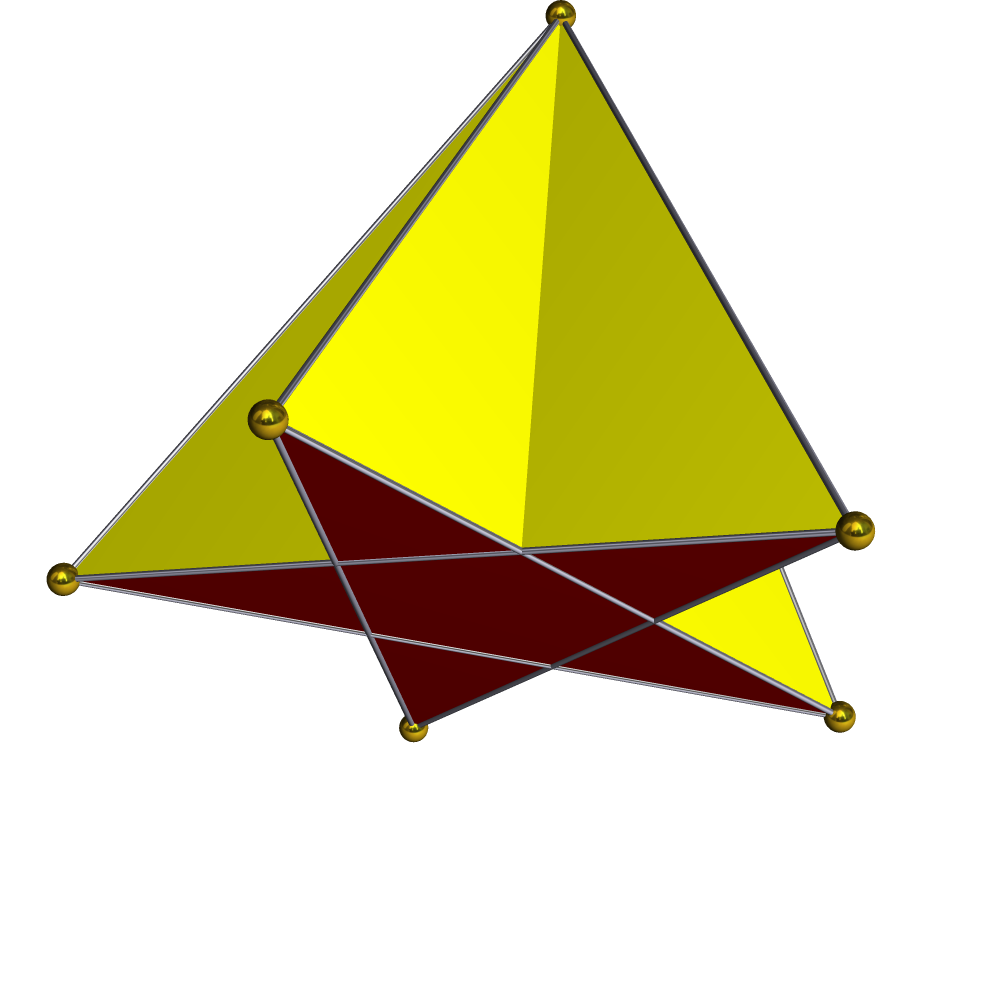
A pentagram-base pyramid.

The type of pyramids can be derived in many ways. The regularity of a pyramid's base may be classified based on the type of polygon: one example is the star pyramid, in which its base is the regular star polygon.

The truncated pyramid is a pyramid cut off by a plane; if the truncation plane is parallel to the base of a pyramid, it is called a frustum.

== Mensuration ==
A polyhedron's surface area is the sum of the areas of its faces. A pyramid's surface area is the sum of the area of triangles and the area of the polygonal base.

The volume of a pyramid is one-third of the product of the base's area and the pyramid's height. The pyramid height is defined as the length of the line segment between the apex and its orthogonal projection on the base. Given that $B$ is the base's area and $h$ is the height of a pyramid, the volume of a pyramid is:
$$V = \frac{1}{3}Bh.$$
The volume of a pyramid was recorded back in ancient Egypt, where they calculated the volume of a square frustum, suggesting they were acquainted with the volume of a square pyramid.

== Generalization ==
4-dimensional hyperpyramid with a cube as base

The hyperpyramid is the generalization of a pyramid in n-dimensional space. In the case of the pyramid, one connects all vertices of the base, a polygon in a plane, to a point outside the plane, which is the peak. The pyramid's height is the distance of the peak from the plane. This construction gets generalized to n dimensions. The base becomes a (n − 1)-polytope in a (n − 1)-dimensional hyperplane. A point called the apex is located outside the hyperplane and gets connected to all the vertices of the polytope and the distance of the apex from the hyperplane is called the height.

The n-dimensional volume of a n-dimensional hyperpyramid can be computed as follows:
$$V_n = \frac{A  \cdot h}{n}.$$
Here V_{n} denotes the n-dimensional volume of the hyperpyramid. A denotes the (n − 1)-dimensional volume of the base and h the height, that is the distance between the apex and the (n − 1)-dimensional hyperplane containing the base A.

== See also ==
- Bipyramid
