= Snub square antiprism =

85th Johnson solid (26 faces)

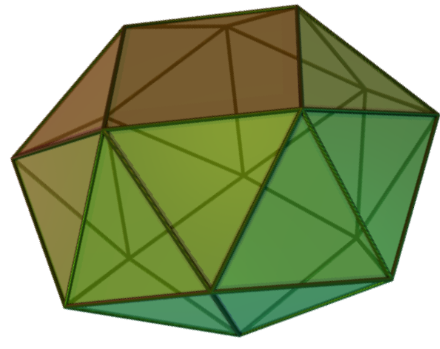
- Type: Johnson; J_{84} – J_{85} – J_{86}
- Faces: 24 triangles 2 squares
- Edges: 40
- Vertices: 16
- Vertex configuration: $8 \times 3^5 + 8 \times 3^4 \times 4$
- Symmetry group: $D_{4d}$
- Dihedral angle (degrees): triangle-to-triangle: eight of 164.257°, sixteen of 144.144°, and eight of 114.645° triangle-to-square: 145.441°
- Properties: convex, elementary

Net
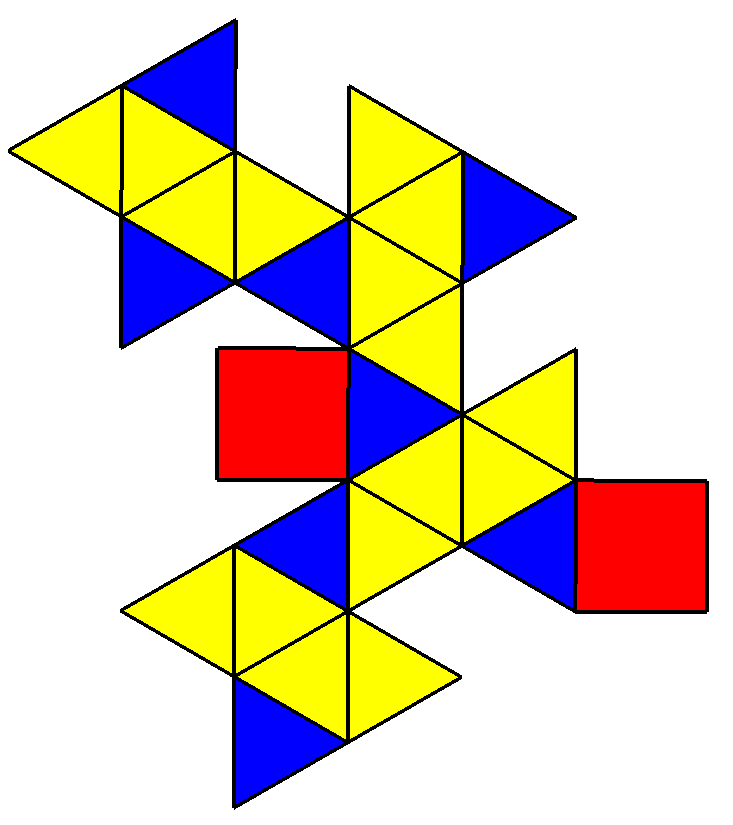

3D model of a snub square antiprism

In geometry, the snub square antiprism is the Johnson solid that can be constructed by snubbing the square antiprism. It is one of the elementary Johnson solids that do not arise from "cut and paste" manipulations of the Platonic and Archimedean solids. However, it is a relative of the icosahedron that has fourfold symmetry instead of threefold. It has 26 faces: 2 squares and 24 triangles; and two types of edges: triangle-square, triangle-triangle.

== Construction ==
=== Result of the construction and classification ===
Snubbing is the process of constructing polyhedra by cutting loose the faces, twisting them, and then attaching equilateral triangles to their edges. As the name suggests, the snub square antiprism is constructed by snubbing the square antiprism, resulting in twenty-four equilateral triangles and two squares as its faces, having 26 faces in total. In addition, it has 40 edges connecting 16 vertices. Eight of the vertices are surrounded by five equilateral triangles and eight of them are surrounded by four equilateral triangles and a square. The vertex configuration of the snub square antiprism is therefore $8 \times (3^5) + 8 \times (3^4 \times 4)$.

Since the snub square antiprism is convex, nonuniform, and has all its faces regular, it is a Johnson solid, named after American mathematician Norman W. Johnson who listed the 92 such polyhedra. In his list, the snub square antiprism is enumerated as the 85th Johnson solid $J_{85}$.

The snub square antiprism is an elementary polyhedron: that is, there is no plane intersecting it only on its edges, so as to cut it into two smaller convex, regular-faced polyhedra.

=== Cartesian coordinates ===
Let $k \approx 0.82354$ be the positive root of the cubic polynomial
$$9x^3+3\sqrt{3}\left(5-\sqrt{2}\right)x^2-3\left(5-2\sqrt{2}\right)x-17\sqrt{3}+7\sqrt{6}.$$
Furthermore, let $h \approx 1.35374$ be defined by
$$h = \frac{\sqrt{2}+8+2\sqrt{3}k-3\left(2+\sqrt{2}\right)k^2}{4\sqrt{3-3k^2}}.$$
Then, Cartesian coordinates of a snub square antiprism with edge length 2 are given by the union of the orbits of the points
$$(1,1,h),\,\left(1+\sqrt{3}k,0,h-\sqrt{3-3k^2}\right)$$
under the action of the group generated by a rotation around the $z$-axis by 90° and by a rotation by 180° around a straight line perpendicular to the $z$-axis and making an angle of 22.5° with the $x$-axis.

== Properties ==
The snub square antiprism has the three-dimensional symmetry of dihedral group $D_{4d}$ of order 16. It cannot produce convex, regular-faced polyhedra whenever being sliced by a plane, an example of an elementary polyhedron.

The snub square antiprism has forty edges. Compartmentalized into two types of polygonal faces, there are thirty-two triangle-to-triangle edges and eight triangle-to-square edges. These types form a dihedral angle, a measured angle between two faces. For triangle-to-triangle, there are three different angles: eight form 164.257°, sixteen form 144.144°, and eight form 114.645°; for triangle-to-square, only one angle forms 145.441°. All of these angles are in approximation.

The surface area and volume of a snub square antiprism with edge length $a$ can be calculated as:
$$\begin{align}
A = \left(2+6\sqrt{3}\right)a^2 &\approx 12.392a^2, \\
V &\approx 3.602 a^3.
\end{align}$$
