= Pentagonal pyramidal molecular geometry =

Molecular geometry

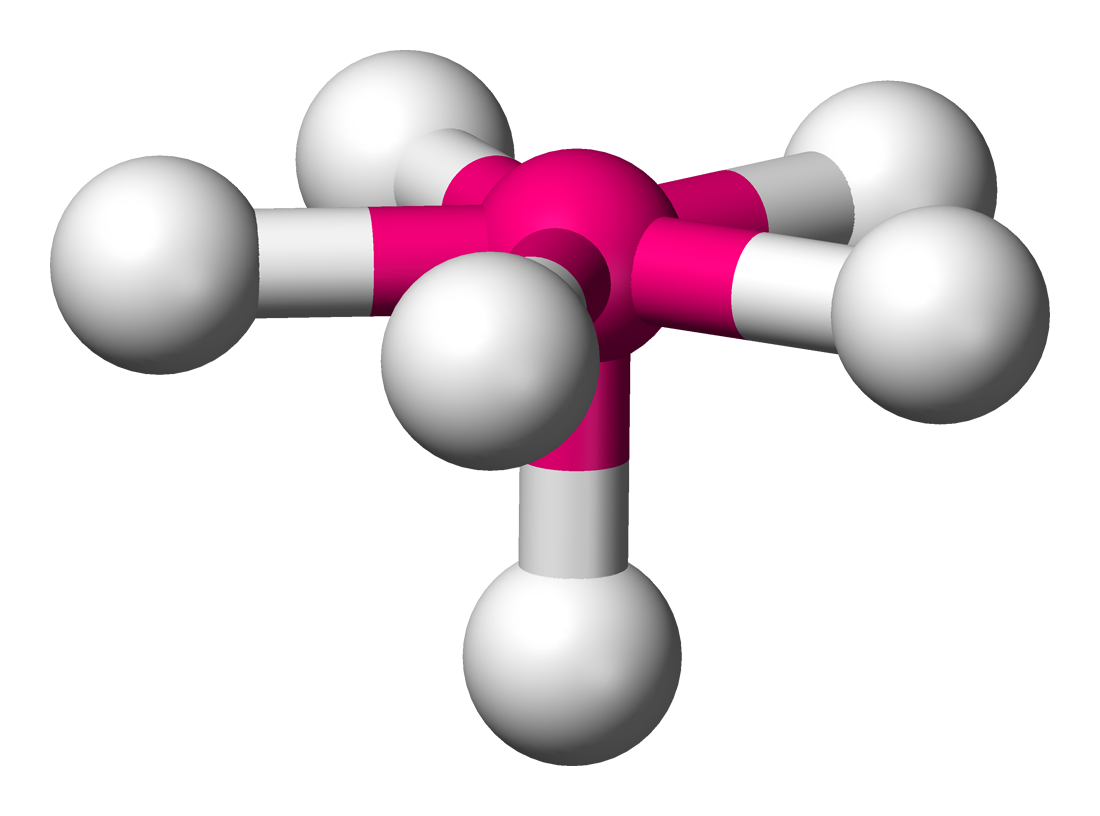
- Examples: XeOF^{−}_{5}
- Point group: C_{5v}
- Coordination number: 6
- Bond angle(s): 90°, 72°
- μ (Polarity): >0

In chemistry, pentagonal pyramidal molecular geometry describes the shape of compounds where in six atoms or groups of atoms or ligands are arranged around a central atom, at the vertices of a pentagonal pyramid. It is one of the few molecular geometries with uneven bond angles.

AX_{6}E_{1}

== Examples ==
- XeOF^{−}_{5}
- IOF^{2−}_{5}
