= Sphenocorona =

86th Johnson solid (14 faces)

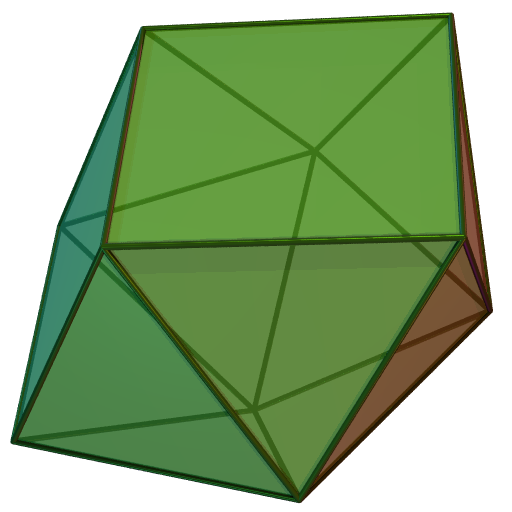
- Type: Johnson; J_{85} – J_{86} – J_{87}
- Faces: 12 triangles 2 squares
- Edges: 22
- Vertices: 10
- Vertex configuration: 4(3^{3}.4); 2(3^{2}.4^{2}); 2×2(3^{5})
- Symmetry group: C_{2v}
- Dual polyhedron: -
- Properties: convex, elementary

Net
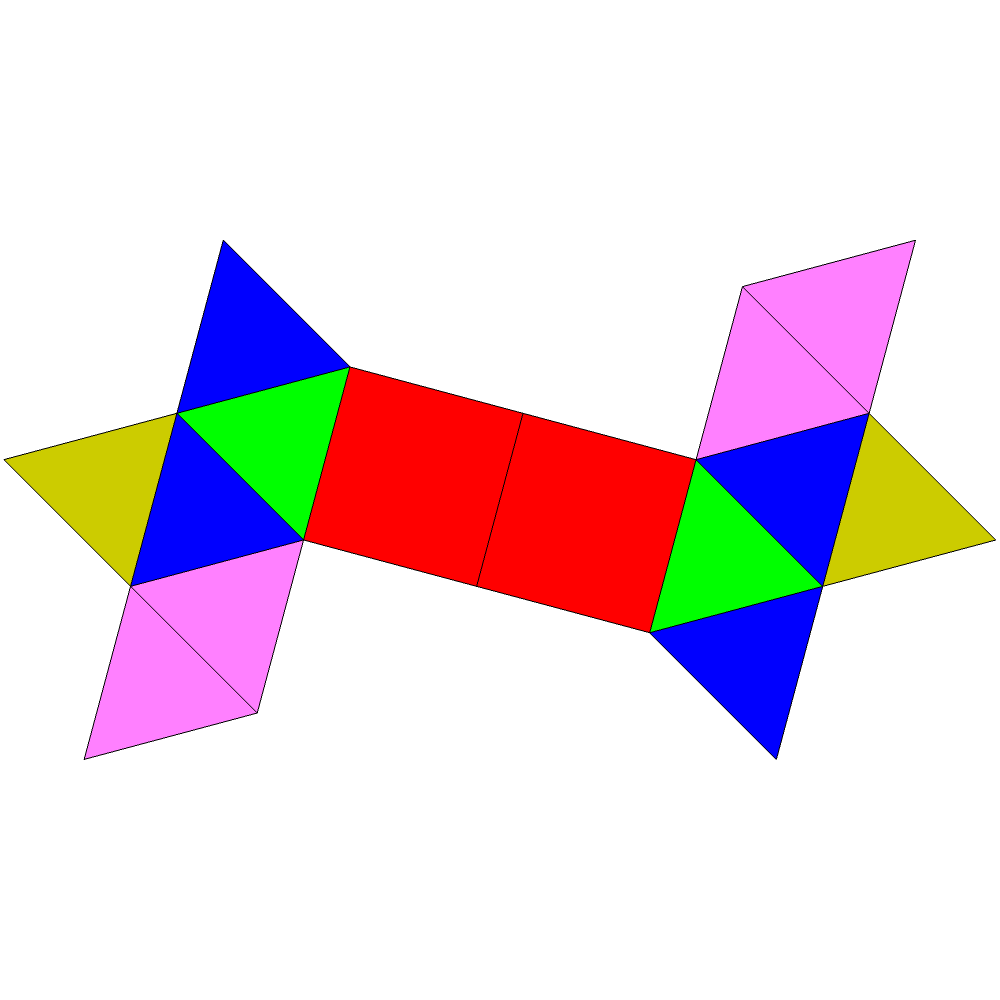

3D model of a sphenocorona

In geometry, the sphenocorona is a Johnson solid with 12 equilateral triangles and 2 squares as its faces.

== Properties ==
The sphenocorona was named by Johnson (1966) in which he used the prefix spheno- referring to a wedge-like complex formed by two adjacent lunes—a square with equilateral triangles attached on its opposite sides. The suffix -corona refers to a crownlike complex of 8 equilateral triangles. By joining both complexes together, the resulting polyhedron has 12 equilateral triangles and 2 squares, making 14 faces. A convex polyhedron in which all faces are regular polygons is called a Johnson solid. The sphenocorona is among them, enumerated as the 86th Johnson solid $J_{86}$. It is an elementary polyhedron, meaning it cannot be separated by a plane into two small regular-faced polyhedra.

The surface area of a sphenocorona with edge length $a$ can be calculated as
$$A=\left(2+3\sqrt{3}\right)a^2\approx7.19615a^2,$$
and its volume as
$$\left(\frac{1}{2}\sqrt{1 + 3 \sqrt{\frac{3}{2}} + \sqrt{13 + 3 \sqrt{6}}}\right)a^3\approx1.51535a^3.$$

== Cartesian coordinates ==
Let

$$\begin{align} k &= \frac{6 + \sqrt{6} + 2\sqrt{213-57\sqrt{6}}}{30} \\ &\approx 0.85273 \end{align}$$

be the smallest positive root of the quartic polynomial $60x^4 - 48x^3 - 100x^2 + 56x + 23$. Then, Cartesian coordinates of a sphenocorona with edge length 2 are given by the union of the orbits of the points
$$\left(0,1,2\sqrt{1-k^2}\right),\,(2k,1,0),\left(0,1+\frac{\sqrt{3-4k^2}}{\sqrt{1-k^2}},\frac{1-2k^2}{\sqrt{1-k^2}}\right),\,\left(1,0,-\sqrt{2+4k-4k^2}\right)$$
under the action of the group generated by reflections about the xz-plane and the yz-plane.

Since the coordinates of the sphenocorona can be expressed using square roots only, it is a constructible polyhedron.

== Variations ==
The sphenocorona is also the vertex figure of the isogonal n-gonal double antiprismoid where n is an odd number greater than one, including the grand antiprism with pairs of trapezoid rather than square faces.

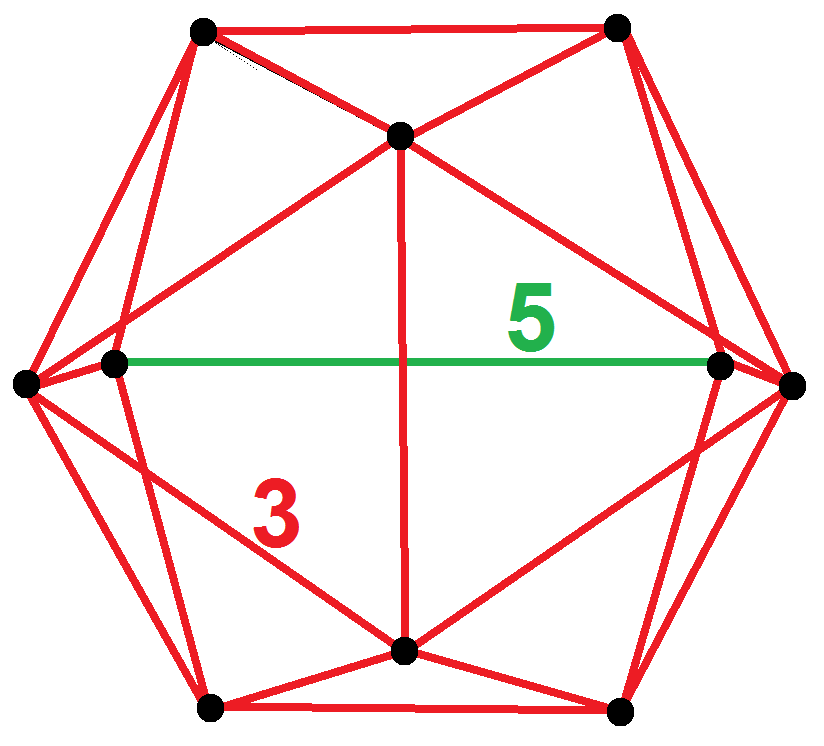

== See also ==
- Augmented sphenocorona
