= Deltahedron =

Polyhedron made of equilateral triangles

The eight convex deltahedra. First row: regular tetrahedron, triangular bipyramid, regular octahedron, pentagonal bipyramid. Second row: gyroelongated square bipyramid, regular icosahedron, triaugmented triangular prism, snub disphenoid.

A deltahedron is a polyhedron whose faces are all equilateral triangles. The deltahedron was named by Martyn Cundy, after the Greek capital letter delta resembling a triangular shape Δ.

Deltahedra can be categorized by the property of convexity. The simplest convex deltahedron is the regular tetrahedron, a pyramid with four equilateral triangles. There are eight convex deltahedra, which can be used in the applications of chemistry as in the polyhedral skeletal electron pair theory and chemical compounds. There are infinitely many non-convex deltahedra.

== Convex deltahedron ==
A convex polyhedron is made of the intersection of finitely many planes. Of the eight convex deltahedra, three are Platonic solids and five are Johnson solids. They are:

- regular tetrahedron, a pyramid with four equilateral triangles, one of which can be considered the base.
- triangular bipyramid, regular octahedron, and pentagonal bipyramid; bipyramids with six, eight, and ten equilateral triangles, respectively. They are constructed by identical pyramids base-to-base.
- gyroelongated square bipyramid and regular icosahedron are constructed by attaching two pyramids onto a square antiprism or pentagonal antiprism, respectively, such that they have sixteen and twenty triangular faces.
- triaugmented triangular prism, constructed by attaching three square pyramids onto the square faces of a triangular prism, such that it has fourteen triangular faces.
- snub disphenoid, with twelve triangular faces, constructed by involving two regular hexagons in the following order: these hexagons may form a bipyramid in degeneracy, separating them into two parts along a coinciding diagonal, pressing inward on the end of diagonal, rotating one of them in 90°, and rejoining them together.

The number of possible convex deltahedrons was given by Rausenberger (1915). Rausenberger named these solids as the convex pseudoregular polyhedra.

Summarizing the examples above, the deltahedra can be conclusively defined as the class of polyhedra whose faces are equilateral triangles. Another definition by Bernal (1964) is similar to the previous one, in which he was interested in the shapes of holes left in irregular close-packed arrangements of spheres. It is stated as a convex polyhedron with equilateral triangular faces that can be formed by the centers of a collection of congruent spheres, whose tangencies represent polyhedron edges, and such that there is no room to pack another sphere inside the cage created by this system of spheres. Because of this restriction, some polyhedrons may not be included as a deltahedron: the triangular bipyramid (as forming two tetrahedral holes rather than a single hole), pentagonal bipyramid (because the spheres for its apexes interpenetrate, so it cannot occur in sphere packings), and regular icosahedron (because it has interior room for another sphere).

Most convex deltahedra can be found in the study of chemistry. For example, they are categorized as the closo polyhedron in the study of polyhedral skeletal electron pair theory. Other applications of deltahedra—excluding the regular icosahedron—are the visualization of an atom cluster surrounding a central atom as a polyhedron in the study of chemical compounds: regular tetrahedron represents the tetrahedral molecular geometry, triangular bipyramid represents trigonal bipyramidal molecular geometry, regular octahedron represents the octahedral molecular geometry, pentagonal bipyramid represents the pentagonal bipyramidal molecular geometry, gyroelongated square bipyramid represents the bicapped square antiprismatic molecular geometry, triaugmented triangular prism represents the tricapped trigonal prismatic molecular geometry, and snub disphenoid represents the dodecahedral molecular geometry. The regular icosahedron along with some other deltahedra appears in the geometry of boron hydride clusters.

== Non-convex deltahedron ==
Stella octangula is a non-convex deltahedron

A non-convex deltahedron is a deltahedron that does not possess convexity, thus it has either coplanar faces or collinear edges. There are infinitely many non-convex deltahedra. Some examples are stella octangula, the excavated dodecahedron, and Boerdijk–Coxeter helix.

There are subclasses of non-convex deltahedra. Cundy (1952) shows that they may be discovered by finding the number of varying vertex's types. A set of vertices is considered the same type as long as there are subgroups of the polyhedron's same group transitive on the set. Cundy shows that the great icosahedron is the only non-convex deltahedron with a single type of vertex. There are seventeen non-convex deltahedra with two types of vertex, and soon the other eleven deltahedra were later added by Olshevsky, Other subclasses are the isohedral deltahedron that was later discovered by both McNeill and Shephard (2000), and the spiral deltahedron constructed by the strips of equilateral triangles was discovered by Trigg (1978).
