= Composite polyhedron =

Polyhedron sliced by a plane into other polyhedra

In geometry, a composite polyhedron is a convex polyhedron that produces two convex, regular-faced polyhedra when sliced by a plane. Repeated slicing of this type until it cannot produce more such polyhedra again is called the elementary polyhedron or non-composite polyhedron.

== Definition and examples ==
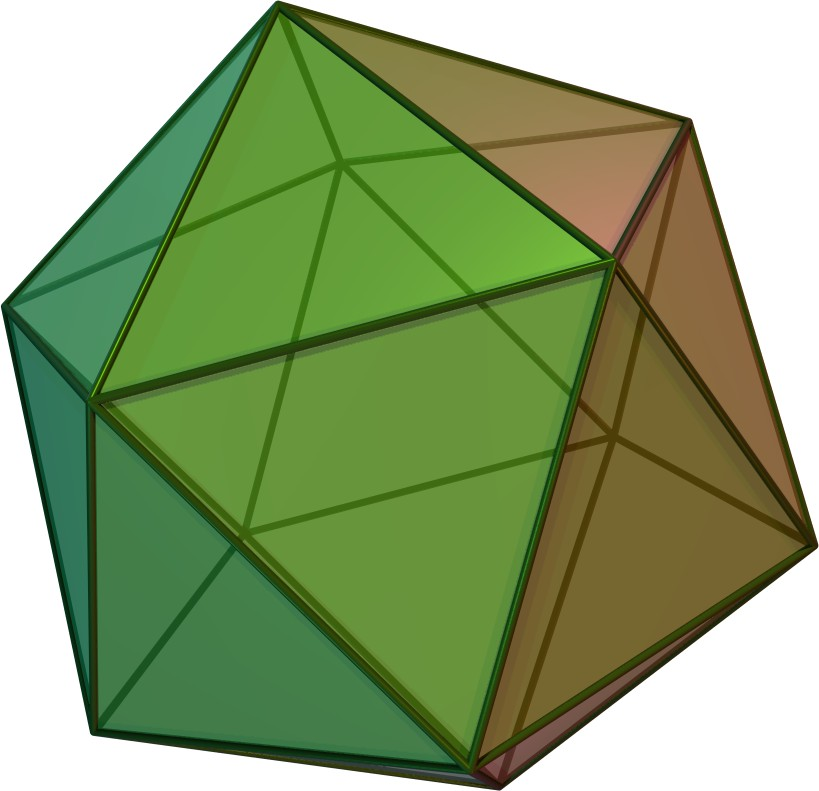
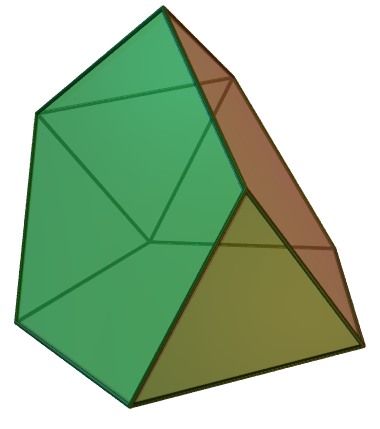
The regular icosahedron is a composite, because of the construction by attaching two pentagonal pyramids onto the bases of a pentagonal antiprism. Slicing three pyramids of a regular icosahedron produces a tridiminished icosahedron, which cannot produce more convex, regular-faced polyhedra again.

A convex polyhedron with regular faces is said to be composite if there exists a plane through a cycle of its edges that is not a face. Slicing the polyhedron on this plane produces two convex-regular-faced polyhedra, having together the same faces as the original polyhedron, along with two new faces on the plane of the slice. Repeated slicing of a polyhedron that cannot produce more convex, regular-faced polyhedra again is called the elementary polyhedron or non-composite polyhedron. One can alternatively define a composite polyhedron as the result of attaching two or more non-composite polyhedra.

The regular octahedron and regular icosahedron are composite. For a regular octahedron, this can be sliced into two equilateral square pyramids, which are elementaries. Slicing the regular icosahedron that removes one and two pyramids by a plane produces other composites, the diminished icosahedron and bidiminished icosahedron; removing the third pyramid produces an elementary polyhedron known as tridiminished icosahedron. Family of prisms and antiprisms are examples of the elementaries. Other than the equilateral square pyramid and the tridiminished icosahedron, the elementary Johnson solids are pentagonal pyramid, triangular cupola, square cupola, pentagonal cupola, pentagonal rotunda, parabidiminished rhombicosidodecahedron, tridiminished rhombicosidodecahedron, snub disphenoid, snub square antiprism, sphenocorona, sphenomegacorona, hebesphenomegacorona, disphenocingulum, bilunabirotunda, and triangular hebesphenorotunda.

The regular-faced elementary polyhedra can be enumerated from the convex regular-faced polyhedra. Zalgaller (1967) expressed interest in enumerating the elementary polyhedra whose faces are either regular polygons or the sums of regular polygons, providing twenty-eight examples. These are called Zalgaller solids. Ivanov (1971) and Pryakhin (1973) provide six more examples, respectively the five Ivanov solids and one Pryakhin solid..
