= Metabidiminished icosahedron =

62nd Johnson solid (12 faces)

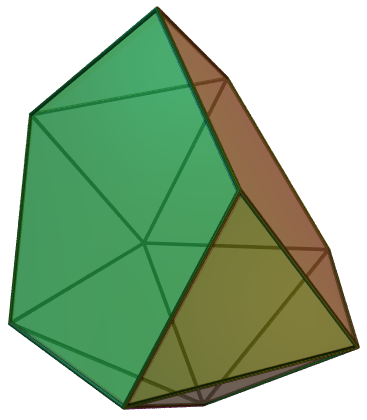
- Type: Johnson; J_{61} – J_{62} – J_{63}
- Faces: 3×2+4 triangles 2 pentagons
- Edges: 20
- Vertices: 10
- Vertex configuration: 2(3.5^{2}); 2+4(3^{3}.5); 2(3^{5})
- Symmetry group: C_{2v}
- Dual polyhedron: -
- Properties: convex

Net
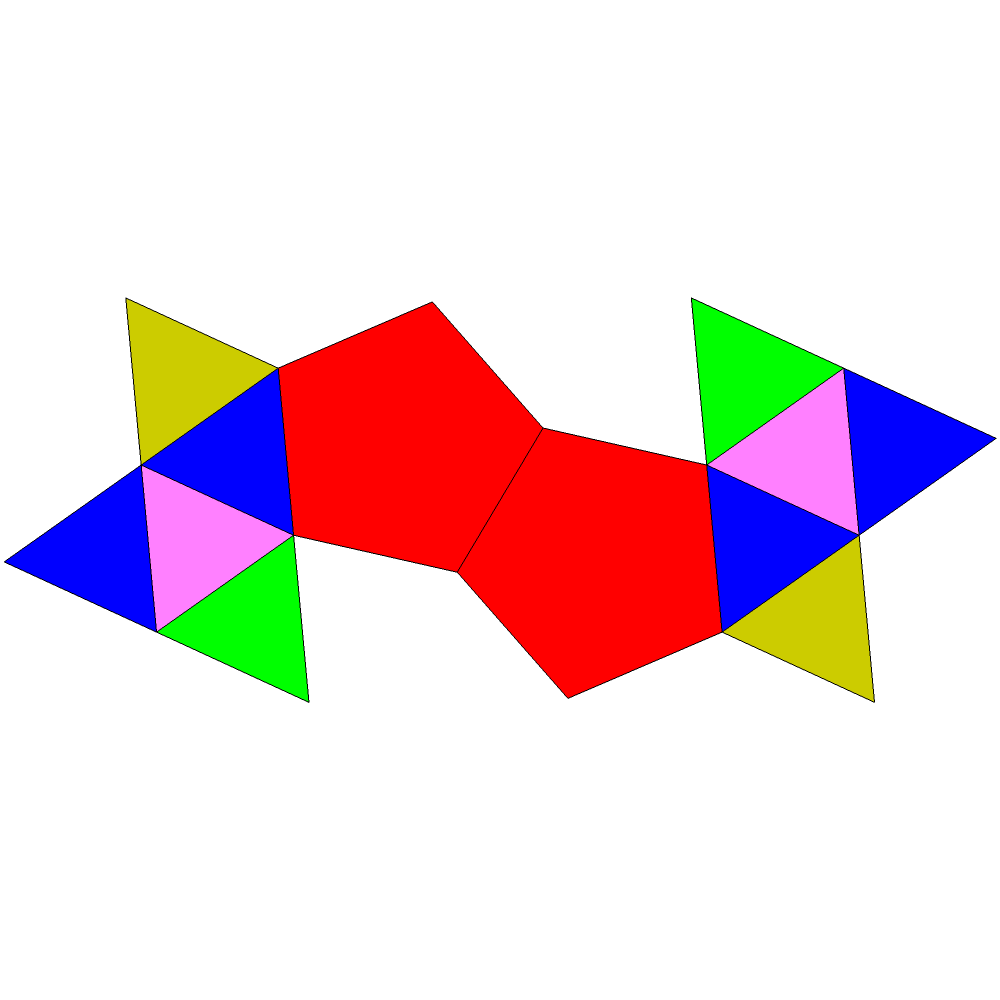

In geometry, the metabidiminished icosahedron is one of the Johnson solids (J_{62}). The name refers to one way of constructing it, by removing two pentagonal pyramids (J_{2}) from a regular icosahedron, replacing two sets of five triangular faces of the icosahedron with two adjacent pentagonal faces. If two pentagonal pyramids are removed to form nonadjacent pentagonal faces, the result is instead the pentagonal antiprism.

A Johnson solid is one of 92 strictly convex polyhedra that are composed of regular polygon faces but are not uniform polyhedra (that is, they are not Platonic solids, Archimedean solids, prisms, or antiprisms). They were named by Norman Johnson, who first listed these polyhedra in 1966.

3D model of a metabidiminished icosahedron
