= Dihedral angle =

Angle between two planes in space

Angle between two half-planes (α, β, pale blue) in a third plane (red) perpendicular to line of intersection.

A dihedral angle is the angle between two intersecting planes or half-planes. It is a plane angle formed on a third plane, perpendicular to the line of intersection between the two planes or the common edge between the two half-planes. In higher dimensions, a dihedral angle represents the angle between two hyperplanes. In chemistry, it is the clockwise angle between half-planes through two sets of three atoms, having two atoms in common.

== Mathematical background ==
When the two intersecting planes are described in terms of Cartesian coordinates by the two equations

$$a_1 x + b_1 y + c_1 z + d_1 = 0$$
$$a_2 x + b_2 y + c_2 z + d_2 = 0$$

the dihedral angle, $\varphi$ between them is given by:

$$\cos \varphi = \frac{\left\vert a_1 a_2 + b_1 b_2 + c_1 c_2 \right\vert}{\sqrt{a_1^2+b_1^2+c_1^2}\sqrt{a_2^2+b_2^2+c_2^2}}$$

and satisfies $0\le \varphi \le \pi/2.$ It can easily be observed that the angle is independent of $d_1$ and $d_2$.

Alternatively, if n_{A} and n_{B} are normal vector to the planes, one has

$$\cos \varphi =  \frac{ \left\vert\mathbf{n}_\mathrm{A} \cdot \mathbf{n}_\mathrm{B}\right\vert}{|\mathbf{n}_\mathrm{A} | |\mathbf{n}_\mathrm{B}|}$$

where n_{A} · n_{B} is the dot product of the vectors and |n_{A}| |n_{B}| is the product of their lengths.

The absolute value is required in above formulas, as the planes are not changed when changing all coefficient signs in one equation, or replacing one normal vector by its opposite.

However the absolute values can be and should be avoided when considering the dihedral angle of two half planes whose boundaries are the same line. In this case, the half planes can be described by a point P of their intersection, and three vectors b_{0}, b_{1} and b_{2} such that P + b_{0}, P + b_{1} and P + b_{2} belong respectively to the intersection line, the first half plane, and the second half plane. The dihedral angle of these two half planes is defined by

$$\cos\varphi = \frac{ (\mathbf{b}_0 \times \mathbf{b}_1) \cdot (\mathbf{b}_0 \times \mathbf{b}_2)}{|\mathbf{b}_0 \times \mathbf{b}_1| |\mathbf{b}_0 \times \mathbf{b}_2|}$$,

and satisfies $0\le\varphi <\pi.$ In this case, switching the two half-planes gives the same result, and so does replacing $\mathbf b_0$ with $-\mathbf b_0.$ In chemistry (see below), we define a dihedral angle such that replacing $\mathbf b_0$ with $-\mathbf b_0$ changes the sign of the angle, which can be between −π and π.

== In polymer physics ==
In some scientific areas such as polymer physics, one may consider a chain of points and links between consecutive points. If the points are sequentially numbered and located at positions r_{1}, r_{2}, r_{3}, etc. then bond vectors are defined by u_{1}=r_{2}−r_{1}, u_{2}=r_{3}−r_{2}, and u_{i}=r_{i+1}−r_{i}, more generally. This is the case for kinematic chains or amino acids in a protein structure. In these cases, one is often interested in the half-planes defined by three consecutive points, and the dihedral angle between two consecutive such half-planes. If u_{1}, u_{2} and u_{3} are three consecutive bond vectors, the intersection of the half-planes is oriented, which allows defining a dihedral angle that belongs to the interval (−π, π]. This dihedral angle is defined by

$$\begin{align}
\cos \varphi&=\frac{ (\mathbf{u}_1 \times \mathbf{u}_2) \cdot (\mathbf{u}_2 \times \mathbf{u}_3)}{|\mathbf{u}_1 \times \mathbf{u}_2|\, |\mathbf{u}_2 \times \mathbf{u}_3|}\\
\sin \varphi&=\frac{ \mathbf{u}_2 \cdot((\mathbf{u}_1 \times \mathbf{u}_2) \times (\mathbf{u}_2 \times \mathbf{u}_3))}{|\mathbf{u}_2|\, |\mathbf{u}_1 \times \mathbf{u}_2|\, |\mathbf{u}_2 \times \mathbf{u}_3|},
\end{align}$$

or, using the function atan2,

$$\varphi=\operatorname{atan2}(\mathbf{u}_2 \cdot((\mathbf{u}_1 \times \mathbf{u}_2) \times (\mathbf{u}_2 \times \mathbf{u}_3)), |\mathbf{u}_2|\,(\mathbf{u}_1 \times \mathbf{u}_2) \cdot (\mathbf{u}_2 \times \mathbf{u}_3)).$$

This dihedral angle does not depend on the orientation of the chain (order in which the point are considered) — reversing this ordering consists of replacing each vector by its opposite vector, and exchanging the indices 1 and 3. Both operations do not change the cosine, but change the sign of the sine. Thus, together, they do not change the angle.

A simpler formula for the same dihedral angle is the following (the proof is given below)

$$\begin{align}
\cos \varphi&=\frac{ (\mathbf{u}_1 \times \mathbf{u}_2) \cdot (\mathbf{u}_2 \times \mathbf{u}_3)}{|\mathbf{u}_1 \times \mathbf{u}_2|\, |\mathbf{u}_2 \times \mathbf{u}_3|}\\
\sin \varphi&=\frac{ |\mathbf{u}_2|\,\mathbf{u}_1 \cdot(\mathbf{u}_2 \times \mathbf{u}_3)}{|\mathbf{u}_1 \times \mathbf{u}_2|\, |\mathbf{u}_2 \times \mathbf{u}_3|},
\end{align}$$

or equivalently,

$$\varphi=\operatorname{atan2}(
|\mathbf{u}_2|\,\mathbf{u}_1 \cdot(\mathbf{u}_2 \times \mathbf{u}_3) ,
(\mathbf{u}_1 \times \mathbf{u}_2) \cdot (\mathbf{u}_2 \times \mathbf{u}_3)).$$

This can be deduced from previous formulas by using the vector quadruple product formula, and the fact that a scalar triple product is zero if it contains twice the same vector:

$$(\mathbf{u}_1\times\mathbf{u}_2)\times(\mathbf{u}_2\times\mathbf{u}_3) = [(\mathbf{u}_2\times\mathbf{u}_3)\cdot\mathbf{u}_1]\mathbf{u}_2 - [(\mathbf{u}_2\times\mathbf{u}_3)\cdot\mathbf{u}_2]\mathbf{u}_1
= [(\mathbf{u}_2\times\mathbf{u}_3)\cdot\mathbf{u}_1]\mathbf{u}_2$$

Given the definition of the cross product, this means that $\varphi$ is the angle in the clockwise direction of the fourth atom compared to the first atom, while looking down the axis from the second atom to the third. Special cases (one may say the usual cases) are $\varphi = \pi$, $\varphi = +\pi/3$ and $\varphi = -\pi/3$, which are called the trans, gauche^{+}, and gauche^{−} conformations.

== In stereochemistry ==
Free energy diagram of n-butane as a function of dihedral angle.

In stereochemistry, a torsion angle is defined as a particular example of a dihedral angle, describing the geometric relation of two parts of a molecule joined by a chemical bond. Every set of three non-colinear atoms of a molecule defines a half-plane. As explained above, when two such half-planes intersect (i.e., a set of four consecutively-bonded atoms), the angle between them is a dihedral angle. Dihedral angles are used to specify the molecular conformation. Stereochemical arrangements corresponding to angles between 0° and ±90° are called syn (s), those corresponding to angles between ±90° and 180° anti (a). Similarly, arrangements corresponding to angles between 30° and 150° or between −30° and −150° are called clinal (c) and those between 0° and ±30° or ±150° and 180° are called periplanar (p).

The two types of terms can be combined so as to define four ranges of angle; 0° to ±30° synperiplanar (sp); 30° to 90° and −30° to −90° synclinal (sc); 90° to 150° and −90° to −150° anticlinal (ac); ±150° to 180° antiperiplanar (ap). The synperiplanar conformation is also known as the syn- or cis-conformation; antiperiplanar as anti or trans; and synclinal as gauche or skew.

For example, with n-butane two planes can be specified in terms of the two central carbon atoms and either of the methyl carbon atoms. The syn-conformation shown above, with a dihedral angle of 60° is less stable than the anti-conformation with a dihedral angle of 180°.

For macromolecular usage the symbols T, C, G^{+}, G^{−}, A^{+} and A^{−} are recommended (ap, sp, +sc, −sc, +ac and −ac respectively).

Configuration names

according to dihedral angle

syn n-Butane in the

gauche^{−} conformation (−60°) Newman projection

syn n-Butane

sawhorse projection

=== Proteins ===
Depiction of a protein, showing where ω, φ, & ψ refer to.

A Ramachandran plot (also known as a Ramachandran diagram or a [φ,ψ] plot), originally developed in 1963 by G. N. Ramachandran, C. Ramakrishnan, and V. Sasisekharan, is a way to visualize energetically allowed regions for backbone dihedral angles ψ against φ of amino acid residues in protein structure.

In a protein chain three dihedral angles are defined:

- ω (omega) is the angle in the chain C^{α} − C' − N − C^{α},
- φ (phi) is the angle in the chain C' − N − C^{α} − C'
- ψ (psi) is the angle in the chain N − C^{α} − C' − N (called φ′ by Ramachandran)

The figure at right illustrates the location of each of these angles (but it does not show correctly the way they are defined).

The planarity of the peptide bond usually restricts ω to be 180° (the typical trans case) or 0° (the rare cis case). The distance between the C^{α} atoms in the trans and cis isomers is approximately 3.8 and 2.9 Å, respectively. The vast majority of the peptide bonds in proteins are trans, though the peptide bond to the nitrogen of proline has an increased prevalence of cis compared to other amino-acid pairs.

The side chain dihedral angles are designated with χ_{n} (chi-n). They tend to cluster near 180°, 60°, and −60°, which are called the trans, gauche^{−}, and gauche^{+} conformations. The stability of certain sidechain dihedral angles is affected by the values φ and ψ. For instance, there are direct steric interactions between the Cγ of the side chain in the gauche^{+} rotamer and the backbone nitrogen of the next residue when ψ is near −60°. This is evident from statistical distributions in backbone-dependent rotamer libraries.

== In polyhedra ==
Every polyhedron has a dihedral angle at every edge describing the relationship of the two faces that share that edge. This dihedral angle, also called the face angle, is measured as the internal angle with respect to the polyhedron. An angle of 0° means the face normal vectors are antiparallel and the faces overlap each other, which implies that it is part of a degenerate polyhedron. An angle of 180° means the faces are parallel, as in a tiling. An angle greater than 180° exists on concave portions of a polyhedron.

Every dihedral angle in a polyhedron that is isotoxal and/or isohedral has the same value. This includes the 5 Platonic solids, the 13 Catalan solids, the 4 Kepler–Poinsot polyhedra, the 2 convex quasiregular polyhedra, and the 2 infinite families of bipyramids and trapezohedra.

== Law of cosines for dihedral angle ==
Given 3 faces of a polyhedron which meet at a common vertex P and have edges AP, BP and CP, the cosine of the dihedral angle between the faces containing APC and BPC is:

$$\cos\varphi = \frac{ \cos (\angle \mathrm{APB})  - \cos (\angle \mathrm{APC}) \cos (\angle \mathrm{BPC})}{ \sin(\angle \mathrm{APC}) \sin(\angle \mathrm{BPC})}$$

This can be deduced from the spherical law of cosines, but can also be found by other means.

== Higher dimensions ==
In m-dimensional Euclidean space, the dihedral angle $\varphi$ between the two hyperplanes defined by the equations
$$\mathbf{n}_\mathrm{A} \cdot \mathbf{x} = c_A$$
$$\mathbf{n}_\mathrm{B} \cdot \mathbf{x} = c_B$$
for vectors n_{A}, n_{B}, x ∈ R^{m} and constants c_{A} and c_{B}, is given by
$$\cos \varphi =  \frac{ \left\vert\mathbf{n}_\mathrm{A} \cdot \mathbf{n}_\mathrm{B}\right\vert}{|\mathbf{n}_\mathrm{A} | |\mathbf{n}_\mathrm{B}|}\,.$$

== See also ==
- Atropisomer
- Spherical angle
