= Solid geometry =

Field of mathematics dealing with three-dimensional Euclidean spaces

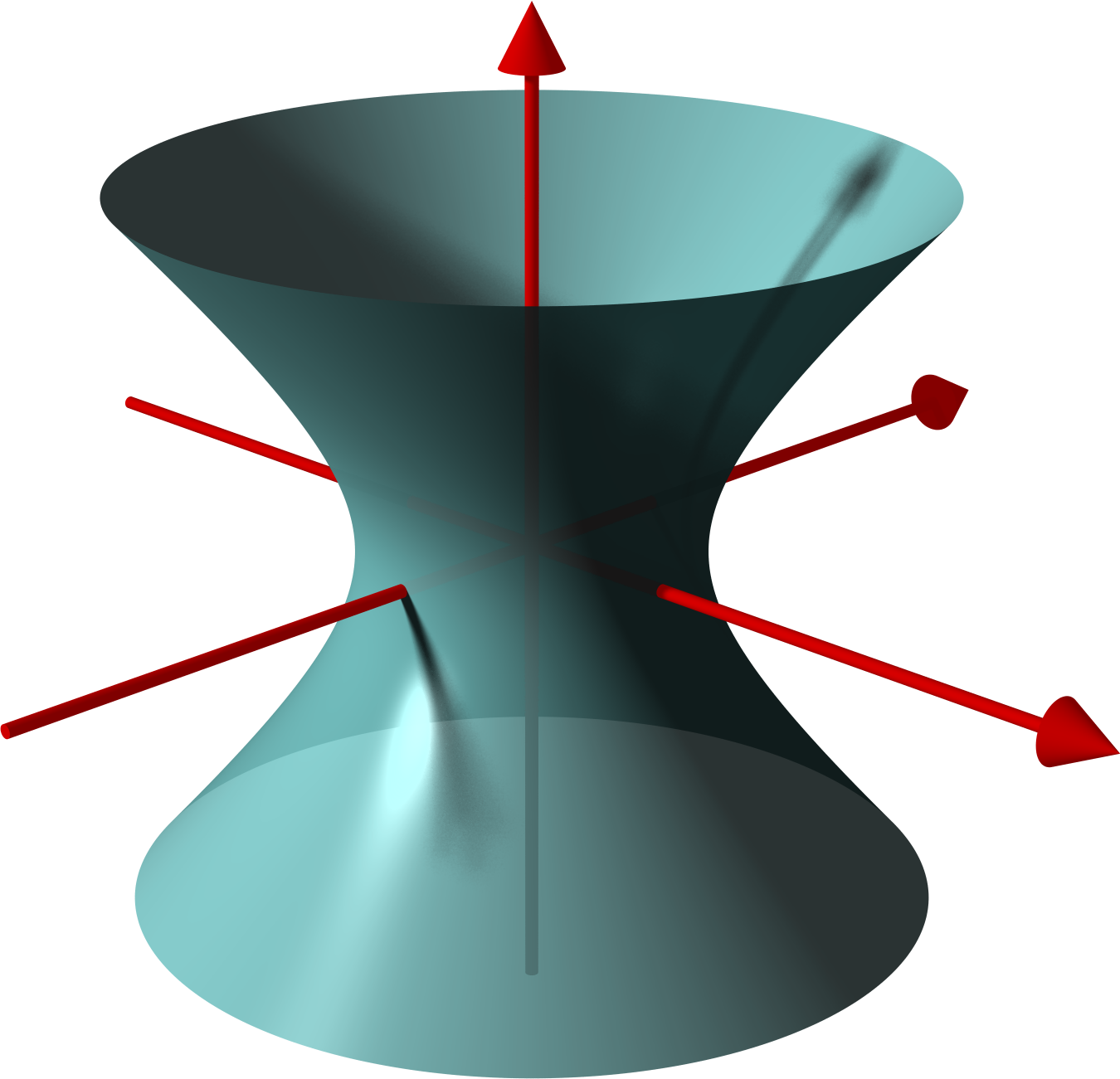
Hyperboloid of one sheet

Solid geometry or stereometry is the geometry of three-dimensional Euclidean space (3D space). A solid figure is the region of 3D space bounded by a two-dimensional closed surface; for example, a solid ball consists of a sphere and its interior.

Solid geometry deals with the measurements of volumes of various solids, including pyramids, prisms, cubes (and other polyhedrons), cylinders, cones (including truncated) and other solids of revolution.

== History ==
The Pythagoreans dealt with the regular solids, but the pyramid, prism, cone and cylinder were not studied until the Platonists. Eudoxus established their measurement, proving the pyramid and cone to have one-third the volume of a prism and cylinder on the same base and of the same height. He was probably also the discoverer of a proof that the volume enclosed by a sphere is proportional to the cube of its radius.

Geometric solids, La pratica de mesurar le terre, 16th century

== Topics ==
Basic topics in solid geometry and stereometry include:

- incidence of planes and lines
- dihedral angle and solid angle
- the cube, cuboid, parallelepiped
- the tetrahedron and other pyramids
- prisms
- octahedron, dodecahedron, icosahedron
- cones and cylinders
- the sphere
- other quadrics: spheroid, ellipsoid, paraboloid and hyperboloids.

Advanced topics include:

- projective geometry of three dimensions (leading to a proof of Desargues' theorem by using an extra dimension)
- further polyhedra
- descriptive geometry.

== List of solid figures ==
Whereas a sphere is the surface of a ball, for other solid figures it is sometimes ambiguous whether the term refers to the surface of the figure or the volume enclosed therein, notably for a cylinder.

Major types of shapes that either constitute or define a volume.
Figure	Definitions	Images	
Parallelepiped	A polyhedron with six faces (hexahedron), each of which is a parallelogram; A hexahedron with three pairs of parallel faces; A prism of which the base is a parallelogram		
Rhombohedron	A parallelepiped where all edges are the same length; A cube, except that its faces are not squares but rhombi		
Cuboid	A convex polyhedron bounded by six quadrilateral faces, whose polyhedral graph is the same as that of a cube; Some sources also require that each of the faces is a rectangle (so each pair of adjacent faces meets in a right angle). This more restrictive type of cuboid is also known as a rectangular cuboid, right cuboid, rectangular box, rectangular hexahedron, right rectangular prism, or rectangular parallelepiped.	Rectangular cuboid	
Polyhedron	Flat polygonal faces, straight edges and sharp corners or vertices	Small stellated dodecahedron	Toroidal polyhedron
Uniform polyhedron	Regular polygons as faces and is vertex-transitive (i.e., there is an isometry mapping any vertex onto any other)	(Regular); Tetrahedron and Cube	Uniform; Snub dodecahedron
Pyramid	A polyhedron comprising an n-sided polygonal base and a vertex point	square pyramid	
Prism	A polyhedron comprising an n-sided polygonal base, a second base which is a translated copy (rigidly moved without rotation) of the first, and n other faces (necessarily all parallelograms) joining corresponding sides of the two bases	hexagonal prism	
Antiprism	A polyhedron comprising an n-sided polygonal base, a second base translated and rotated.sides]] of the two bases	square antiprism	
Bipyramid	A polyhedron comprising an n-sided polygonal center with two apexes.	triangular bipyramid	
Trapezohedron	A polyhedron with 2n kite faces around an axis, with half offsets	tetragonal trapezohedron	
Cone	Tapers smoothly from a flat base (frequently, though not necessarily, circular) to a point called the apex or vertex	A right circular cone and an oblique circular cone	
Cylinder	Straight parallel sides and a circular or oval cross section	A solid elliptic cylinder	A right and an oblique circular cylinder
Ellipsoid	A surface that may be obtained from a sphere by deforming it by means of directional scalings, or more generally, of an affine transformation	Examples of ellipsoids	${x^2 \over a^2}+{y^2 \over b^2}+{z^2 \over c^2}=1:$ sphere (top, a=b=c=4), spheroid (bottom left, a=b=5, c=3), tri-axial ellipsoid (bottom right, a=4.5, b=6, c=3)]]
Lemon	A lens (or less than half of a circular arc) rotated about an axis passing through the endpoints of the lens (or arc)		
Hyperboloid	A surface that is generated by rotating a hyperbola around one of its principal axes		

== Techniques ==
Various techniques and tools are used in solid geometry. Among them, analytic geometry and vector techniques have a major impact by allowing the systematic use of linear equations and matrix algebra, which are important for higher dimensions.

== Applications ==
A major application of solid geometry and stereometry is in 3D computer graphics.

== See also ==
- Euclidean geometry
- Shape
- Solid modeling
- Surface
