= Truncated hexagonal trapezohedron =

Truncated trapezohedron with a 6-sided base

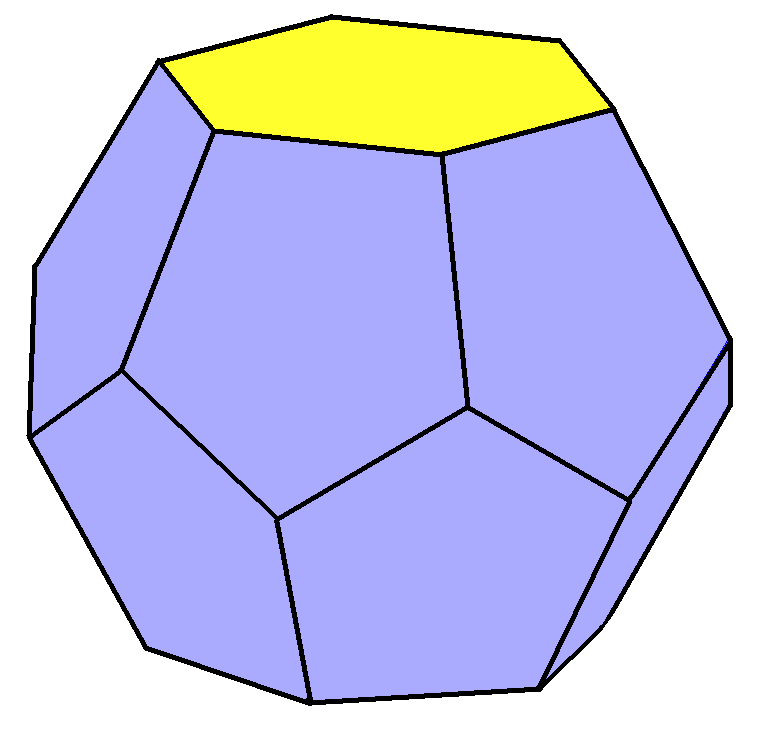
- Type: Truncated trapezohedron
- Faces: 12 pentagons 2 hexagons
- Edges: 36
- Vertices: 24
- Conway notation: t6dA6
- Symmetry group: D_{6d}, [12,2^{+}], 2*6, order 24
- Rotation group: D_{6}, [6,2]^{+}, 226, order 12
- Dual polyhedron: Gyroelongated hexagonal dipyramid
- Properties: convex

In geometry, the truncated hexagonal trapezohedron is the fourth in an infinite series of truncated trapezohedra. It has 12 pentagon and 2 hexagon faces. It can be constructed by taking a hexagonal trapezohedron and truncating the polar axis vertices.

== Weaire–Phelan structure ==
The Weaire–Phelan structure contains another form of this polyhedron that has D_{2d} symmetry and is a part of a space-filling honeycomb along with an irregular dodecahedron.

Irregular tetradecahedron (Truncated hexagonal trapezohedron)	Weaire–Phelan honeycomb

== See also ==
- Goldberg polyhedron
