= Decahedron =

Polyhedron with 10 faces

A 10-sided die

In geometry, a decahedron is a polyhedron with ten faces. There are 32300 topologically distinct decahedra, and none are regular, so this name does not identify a specific type of polyhedron except for the number of faces.

Some decahedra have regular faces:

- Octagonal prism (uniform 8-prism)
- Square antiprism (uniform 4-antiprism)
- Square cupola (Johnson solid 4)
- Pentagonal bipyramid (Johnson solid 13, 5-bipyramid)
- Augmented pentagonal prism (Johnson solid 52)
- Augmented tridiminished icosahedron (Johnson solid 64)

Decahedra with irregular faces include:

- Pentagonal trapezohedron (5-trapezohedron, antiprism dual) – often used as a die in role playing games, known as a d10
- Truncated square trapezohedron
- Enneagonal pyramid (9-pyramid)
- Ten of diamonds decahedron - a space-filling polyhedron with D_{2d} symmetry
- Chamfered tetrahedron
- Square bifrustum
