= Padovan =

Padovan is a surname. Notable people with the surname include:

- Arigo Padovan (1927–2025), Italian cyclist
- Fabio Padovan (born 1955), Italian politician
- Richard Padovan (born 1935), English architect, writer and translator
- Stefano Padovan (born 1994), Italian footballer
- Vitomir Padovan, Yugoslav water polo player

== See also ==
- Padovan sequence, integer sequence
