= The spider and the fly problem =

Recreational geodesics problem

Isometric projection and net of naive (1) and optimal (2) solutions of the spider and the fly problem

The spider and the fly problem is a recreational mathematics problem with an unintuitive solution, asking for a shortest path or geodesic between two points on the surface of a cuboid. It was originally posed by Henry Dudeney.

== Problem ==
In the typical version of the puzzle, an otherwise empty cuboid room 30 feet long, 12 feet wide and 12 feet high contains a spider and a fly. The spider is 1 foot below the ceiling and horizontally centred on one 12′×12′ wall. The fly is 1 foot above the floor and horizontally centred on the opposite wall. The problem is to find the minimum distance the spider must crawl along the walls, ceiling and/or floor to reach the fly, which remains stationary.

== Solutions ==
A naive solution is for the spider to remain horizontally centred, and crawl up to the ceiling, across it and down to the fly, giving a distance of 42 feet. Instead, the shortest path, 40 feet long, spirals around five of the six faces of the cuboid. Alternatively, it can be described by unfolding the cuboid into a net and finding a shortest path (a line segment) on the resulting unfolded system of six rectangles in the plane. Different nets produce different segments with different lengths, and the question becomes one of finding a net whose segment length is minimum. Another path, of intermediate length $\sqrt{1658}\approx 40.7$, crosses diagonally through four faces instead of five.

For a room of length l, width w and height h, the spider a distance b below the ceiling, and the fly a distance a above the floor, length of the spiral path is $\sqrt{(w + h)^2 + (b + l + a)^2}$ while the naive solution has length $l + h - | b - a |$. Depending on the dimensions of the cuboid, and on the initial positions of the spider and fly, one or another of these paths, or of four other paths, may be the optimal solution. However, there is no rectangular cuboid, and two points on the cuboid, for which the shortest path passes through all six faces of the cuboid.

A different lateral thinking solution, beyond the stated rules of the puzzle, involves the spider attaching dragline silk to the wall to lower itself to the floor, and crawling 30 feet across it and 1 foot up the opposite wall, giving a crawl distance of 31 feet. Similarly, it can climb to the ceiling, cross it, then attach the silk to lower itself 11 feet, also a 31-foot crawl.

== History ==
The problem was originally posed by Henry Dudeney in the English newspaper Weekly Dispatch on 14 June 1903 and collected in The Canterbury Puzzles (1907). Martin Gardner calls it "Dudeney's best-known brain-teaser".

A version of the problem was recorded by Adolf Hurwitz in his diary in 1908. Hurwitz stated that he heard it from L. Gustave du Pasquier, who in turn had heard it from Richard von Mises.
