= Hexagonal antiprism =

Antiprism with 6-sided caps

Uniform hexagonal antiprism
Type	Prismatic uniform polyhedron
Elements	F = 14, E = 24; V = 12 (χ = 2)
Faces by sides	12{3}+2{6}
Schläfli symbol	s{2,12} sr{2,6}
Wythoff symbol	| 2 2 6
Coxeter diagram	
Symmetry group	D_{6d}, [2^{+},12], (2*6), order 24
Rotation group	D_{6}, [6,2]^{+}, (622), order 12
References	U_{77(d)}
Dual	Hexagonal trapezohedron
Properties	convex
Vertex figure 3.3.3.6

In geometry, the hexagonal antiprism is the 4th in an infinite set of antiprisms formed by an even-numbered sequence of triangle sides closed by two polygon caps.

Antiprisms are similar to prisms except the bases are twisted relative to each other, and that the side faces are triangles, rather than quadrilaterals.

In the case of a regular n-sided base, one usually considers the case where its copy is twisted by an angle 180°/n. Extra regularity is obtained by the line connecting the base centers being perpendicular to the base planes, making it a right antiprism. As faces, it has the two n-gonal bases and, connecting those bases, 2n isosceles triangles.

If faces are all regular, it is a semiregular polyhedron.

3D model of a uniform hexagonal antiprism

== Crossed antiprism ==
A crossed hexagonal antiprism is a star polyhedron, topologically identical to the convex hexagonal antiprism with the same vertex arrangement, but it can't be made uniform; the sides are isosceles triangles. Its vertex configuration is 3.3/2.3.6, with one triangle retrograde. It has D_{6d} symmetry, order 24.

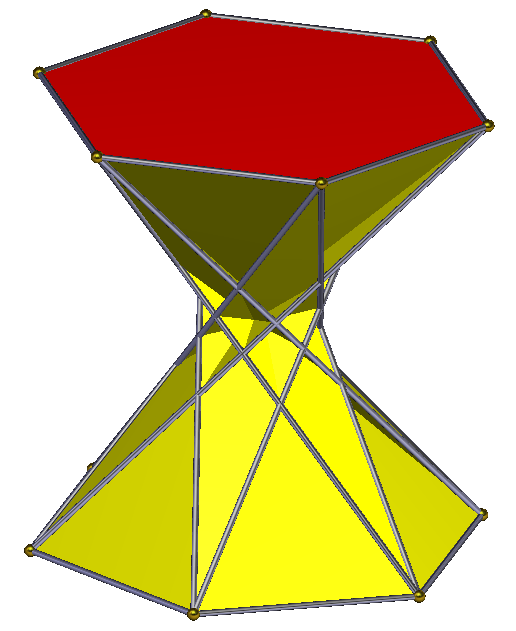

== Related polyhedra ==
The hexagonal faces can be replaced by coplanar triangles, leading to a nonconvex polyhedron with 24 equilateral triangles.

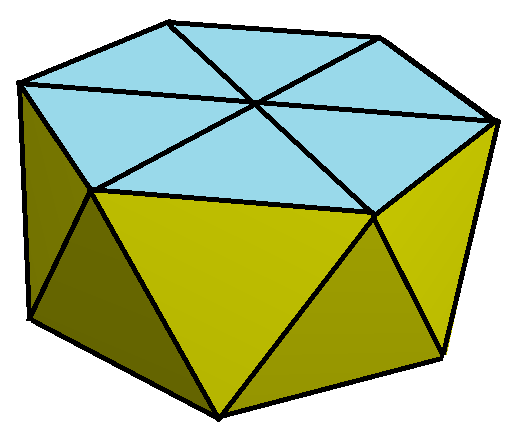

Uniform hexagonal dihedral spherical polyhedra
Symmetry: [6,2], (*622)							[6,2]^{+}, (622)	[6,2^{+}], (2*3)
{6,2}	t{6,2}	r{6,2}	t{2,6}	{2,6}	rr{6,2}	tr{6,2}	sr{6,2}	s{2,6}
Duals to uniforms
V6^{2}	V12^{2}	V6^{2}	V4.4.6	V2^{6}	V4.4.6	V4.4.12	V3.3.3.6	V3.3.3.3

Family of uniform n-gonal antiprisms
Antiprism name	Digonal antiprism	(Trigonal) Triangular antiprism	(Tetragonal) Square antiprism	Pentagonal antiprism	Hexagonal antiprism	Heptagonal antiprism	...	Apeirogonal antiprism
Polyhedron image							...	
Spherical tiling image							Plane tiling image	
Vertex config.	2.3.3.3	3.3.3.3	4.3.3.3	5.3.3.3	6.3.3.3	7.3.3.3	...	∞.3.3.3
