= Hexagonal trapezohedron =

Polyhedron made of 12 congruent kites

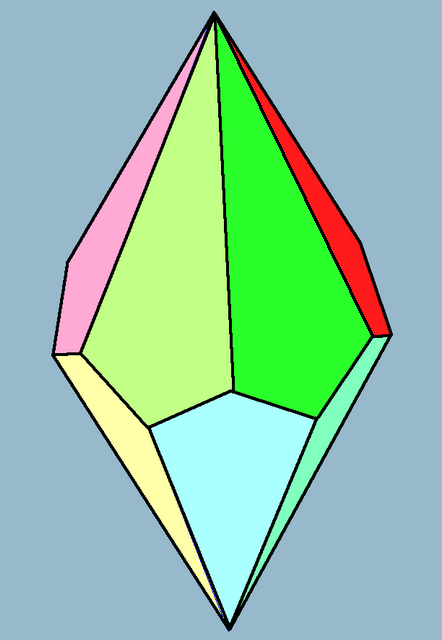
- Type: trapezohedron
- Faces: 12 kites
- Edges: 24
- Vertices: 14
- Vertex configuration: V6.3.3.3
- Symmetry group: D_{6d}, [2^{+},12], (2*6), order 24
- Rotation group: D_{6}, [2,6]^{+}, (66), order 12
- Dual polyhedron: hexagonal antiprism
- Properties: convex, face-transitive

In geometry, a hexagonal trapezohedron or deltohedron is the fourth in an infinite series of trapezohedra which are dual polyhedra to the antiprisms. It has twelve faces which are congruent kites. It can be described by the Conway notation dA6.

It is an isohedral (face-transitive) figure, meaning that all its faces are the same. More specifically, all faces are not merely congruent but also transitive, i.e. lie within the same symmetry orbit. Convex isohedral polyhedra are the shapes that will make fair dice.

== Symmetry ==
3D model of a hexagonal trapezohedron

The symmetry a hexagonal trapezohedron is D_{6d} of order 24. The rotation group is D_{6} of order 12.

== Variations ==
One degree of freedom within D_{6} symmetry changes the kites into congruent quadrilaterals with 3 edges lengths. In the limit, one edge of each quadrilateral goes to zero length, and these become bipyramids.

Crystal arrangements of atoms can repeat in space with a hexagonal trapezohedral configuration around one atom, which is always enantiomorphous, and comprises space groups 177–182. Beta-quartz is the only common mineral with this crystal system.

If the kites surrounding the two peaks are of different shapes, it can only have C_{6v} symmetry, order 12. These can be called unequal trapezohedra. The dual is an unequal antiprism, with the top and bottom polygons of different radii. If it twisted and unequal its symmetry is reduced to cyclic symmetry, C_{6} symmetry, order 6.

Example variations
Type	Twisted trapezohedra (isohedral)	Unequal trapezohedra	Unequal and twisted
Symmetry	D_{6}, (662), [6,2]^{+}, order 12	C_{6v}, (*66), [6], order 12	C_{6}, (66), [6]^{+}, order 6
Image (n=6)			
Net			

== Spherical tiling ==
The hexagonal trapezohedron also exists as a spherical tiling, with 2 vertices on the poles, and alternating vertices equally spaced above and below the equator.

== Related polyhedra ==
Uniform hexagonal dihedral spherical polyhedra
Symmetry: [6,2], (*622)							[6,2]^{+}, (622)	[6,2^{+}], (2*3)
{6,2}	t{6,2}	r{6,2}	t{2,6}	{2,6}	rr{6,2}	tr{6,2}	sr{6,2}	s{2,6}
Duals to uniforms
V6^{2}	V12^{2}	V6^{2}	V4.4.6	V2^{6}	V4.4.6	V4.4.12	V3.3.3.6	V3.3.3.3

Family of n-gonal trapezohedra
Trapezohedron name	Digonal trapezohedron (Tetrahedron)	Trigonal trapezohedron	Tetragonal trapezohedron	Pentagonal trapezohedron	Hexagonal trapezohedron	...	Apeirogonal trapezohedron
Polyhedron image						...	
Spherical tiling image						Plane tiling image	
Face configuration	V2.3.3.3	V3.3.3.3	V4.3.3.3	V5.3.3.3	V6.3.3.3	...	V∞.3.3.3
