= Padovan polynomials =

In mathematics, Padovan polynomials are a generalization of Padovan sequence numbers. These polynomials are defined by:

$$P_n(x) = \begin{cases}
1,                     &\mbox{if }n=1\\
0,                     &\mbox{if }n=2\\
x,                     &\mbox{if }n=3\\
xP_{n-2}(x)+P_{n-3}(x),&\mbox{if } n\ge4.
\end{cases}$$

The first few Padovan polynomials are:

$$P_1(x)=1 \,$$
$$P_2(x)=0 \,$$
$$P_3(x)=x \,$$
$$P_4(x)=1 \,$$
$$P_5(x)=x^2 \,$$
$$P_6(x)=2x \,$$
$$P_7(x)=x^3+1 \,$$
$$P_8(x)=3x^2 \,$$
$$P_9(x)=x^4+3x \,$$
$$P_{10}(x)=4x^3+1\,$$
$$P_{11}(x)=x^5+6x^2.\,$$

The Padovan numbers are recovered by evaluating the polynomials P_{n−3}(x) at x = 1.

Evaluating P_{n−3}(x) at x = 2 gives the nth Fibonacci number plus (−1)^{n}. (sequence A008346 in the OEIS)

The ordinary generating function for the sequence is

$$\sum_{n=1}^\infty P_n(x) t^n = \frac{t}{1 - x t^2 - t^3} .$$

== See also ==
- Polynomial sequences
