= Tetragonal trapezohedron =

Trapezohedron with eight faces

Tetragonal trapezohedron
Click on picture for large version.
Type	trapezohedra
Conway	dA4
Coxeter diagram	
Faces	8 kites
Edges	16
Vertices	10
Face configuration	V4.3.3.3
Symmetry group	D_{4d}, [2^{+},8], (2*4), order 16
Rotation group	D_{4}, [2,4]^{+}, (224), order 8
Dual polyhedron	Square antiprism
Properties	convex, face-transitive

3D model of a tetragonal trapezohedron.

In geometry, a tetragonal trapezohedron, or deltohedron, is the second in an infinite series of trapezohedra, which are dual to the antiprisms. It has eight faces, which are congruent kites, and is dual to the square antiprism.

== Applications ==
=== In mesh generation ===
This shape has been used as a test case for hexahedral mesh generation, simplifying an earlier test case posited by mathematician Robert Schneiders in the form of a square pyramid with its boundary subdivided into 16 quadrilaterals. In this context the tetragonal trapezohedron has also been called the cubical octahedron, quadrilateral octahedron, or octagonal spindle, because it has eight quadrilateral faces and is uniquely defined as a combinatorial polyhedron by that property. Adding four cuboids to a mesh for the cubical octahedron would also give a mesh for Schneiders' pyramid. As a simply-connected polyhedron with an even number of quadrilateral faces, the cubical octahedron can be decomposed into topological cuboids with curved faces that meet face-to-face without subdividing the boundary quadrilaterals, and an explicit mesh of this type has been constructed. However, it is unclear whether a decomposition of this type can be obtained in which all the cuboids are convex polyhedra with flat faces.

=== In art ===
A tetragonal trapezohedron appears in the upper left as one of the polyhedral "stars" in M. C. Escher's 1948 wood engraving Stars.

== Spherical tiling ==
The tetragonal trapezohedron also exists as a spherical tiling, with 2 vertices on the poles, and alternating vertices equally spaced above and below the equator.

== Related polyhedra ==
Family of n-gonal trapezohedra
Trapezohedron name	Digonal trapezohedron (Tetrahedron)	Trigonal trapezohedron	Tetragonal trapezohedron	Pentagonal trapezohedron	Hexagonal trapezohedron	...	Apeirogonal trapezohedron
Polyhedron image						...	
Spherical tiling image						Plane tiling image	
Face configuration	V2.3.3.3	V3.3.3.3	V4.3.3.3	V5.3.3.3	V6.3.3.3	...	V∞.3.3.3

The tetragonal trapezohedron is first in a series of dual snub polyhedra and tilings with face configuration V3.3.4.3.n.

4n2 symmetry mutations of snub tilings: 3.3.4.3.n
Symmetry 4n2	Spherical		Euclidean	Compact hyperbolic				Paracomp.
Symmetry 4n2	242	342	442	542	642	742	842	∞42
Snub figures								
Config.	3.3.4.3.2	3.3.4.3.3	3.3.4.3.4	3.3.4.3.5	3.3.4.3.6	3.3.4.3.7	3.3.4.3.8	3.3.4.3.∞
Gyro figures								
Config.	V3.3.4.3.2	V3.3.4.3.3	V3.3.4.3.4	V3.3.4.3.5	V3.3.4.3.6	V3.3.4.3.7	V3.3.4.3.8	V3.3.4.3.∞
