= Cuboid =

Convex polyhedron with six faces with four edges each

Example of a quadrilateral-faced non-convex hexahedron

In geometry, a cuboid is a hexahedron with quadrilateral faces, meaning it is a polyhedron with six faces; it has eight vertices and twelve edges. A rectangular cuboid (sometimes also called a "cuboid") has all right angles and equal opposite rectangular faces. Etymologically, "cuboid" means "like a cube", in the sense of a convex solid which can be transformed into a cube (by adjusting the lengths of its edges and the angles between its adjacent faces). A cuboid is a convex polyhedron whose polyhedral graph is the same as that of a cube.

General cuboids have many different types. When all of the rectangular cuboid's edges are equal in length, it results in a cube, with six square faces and adjacent faces meeting at right angles. Along with the rectangular cuboids, a parallelepiped is a cuboid with six parallelogram faces. A rhombohedron is a cuboid with six rhombus faces. A square frustum is a frustum with a square base, but the rest of its faces are quadrilaterals; the square frustum is formed by truncating the apex of a square pyramid. In attempting to classify cuboids by their symmetries, Robertson (1983) found that there were at least 22 different cases, "of which only about half are familiar in the shapes of everyday objects".

There exist quadrilateral-faced hexahedra which are non-convex.

Some notable cuboids (quadrilateral-faced convex hexahedra • 8 vertices and 12 edges each)
Image	Name	Faces	Symmetry group
	Cube	6 congruent squares	O_{h}, [4,3], (*432) order 48
	Trigonal trapezohedron	6 congruent rhombi	D_{3d}, [2^{+},6], (2*3) order 12
	Rectangular cuboid	3 pairs of rectangles	D_{2h}, [2,2], (*222) order 8
	Right rhombic prism	1 pair of rhombi, 4 congruent squares	D_{2h}, [2,2], (*222) order 8
	Right square frustum	2 non-congruent squares, 4 congruent isosceles trapezoids	C_{4v}, [4], (*44) order 8
	Twisted trigonal trapezohedron	6 congruent quadrilaterals	D_{3}, [2,3]^{+}, (223) order 6
	Right isosceles-trapezoidal prism	1 pair of isosceles trapezoids; 1, 2 or 3 (congruent) square(s)	?, ?, ? order 4
	Rhombohedron	3 pairs of rhombi	C_{i}, [2^{+},2^{+}], (×) order 2
	Parallelepiped	3 pairs of parallelograms	C_{i}, [2^{+},2^{+}], (×) order 2

== See also ==
- Hypercube
- Lists of shapes
