= Truncated trapezohedron =

Polyhedron made by cutting off a trapezohedron's polar vertices

Set of n-gonal truncated trapezohedra
- Example: pentagonal truncated trapezohedron (regular dodecahedron)
- Faces: 2 n-sided polygons, 2n pentagons
- Edges: 6n
- Vertices: 4n
- Conway notation: t4dA4 t5dA5 t6dA6
- Symmetry group: D_{nd}, [2^{+},2n], (2*n), order 4n
- Rotation group: D_{n}, [2,n]^{+}, (22n), order 2n
- Dual polyhedron: gyroelongated bipyramids
- Properties: convex

In geometry, an n-gonal truncated trapezohedron is a polyhedron formed by a n-gonal trapezohedron with n-gonal pyramids truncated from its two polar axis vertices.

The vertices can be grouped as four n-gons in four parallel planes. The alternating orientation in the middle defines the 2n pentagons.

The regular dodecahedron is the most well-known polyhedron in this class. It is a Platonic solid, having 12 congruent regular pentagons as faces.

Every truncated trapezohedron has three faces meeting at every vertex. Therefore the dual polyhedra of the truncated trapezohedra are the gyroelongated bipyramids, which have all triangular faces (some of which have all equilateral triangular faces). For example, the dual of the regular dodecahedron is the regular icosahedron.

== Forms ==
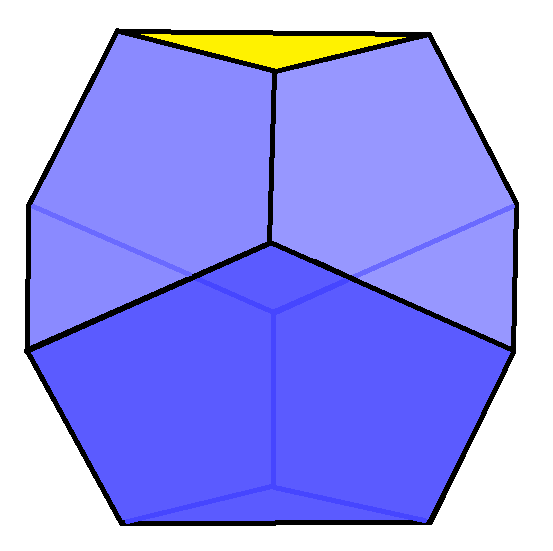
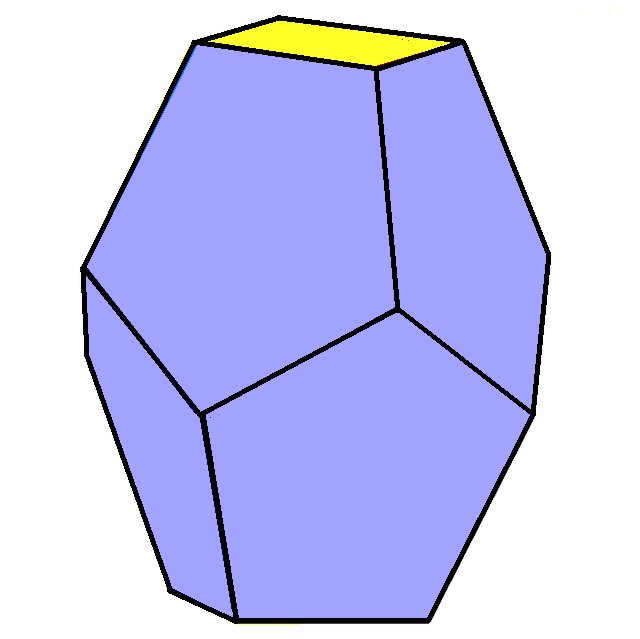
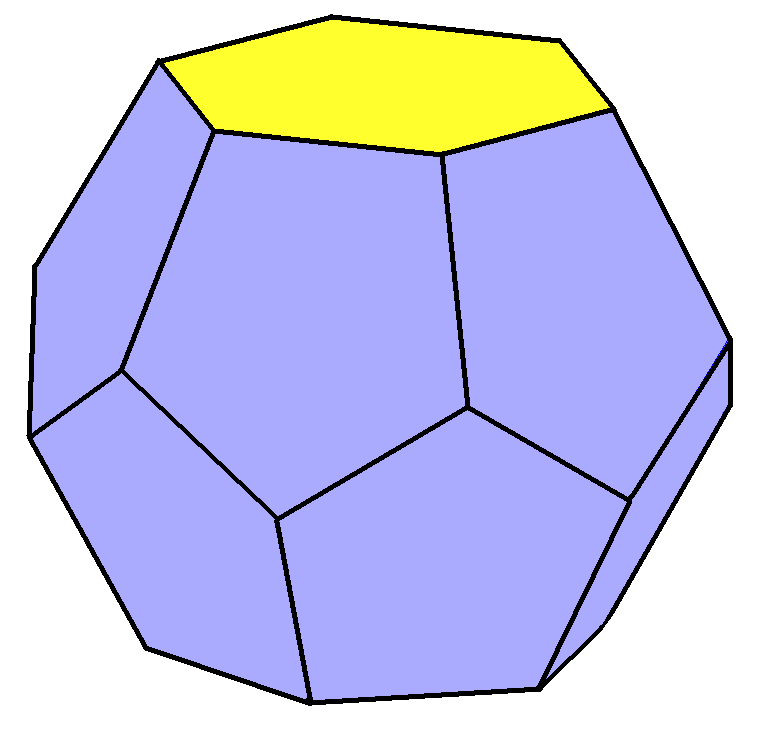

- Truncated triangular trapezohedron (Dürer's solid) – 6 pentagons, 2 triangles; its dual is the gyroelongated [triangular] bipyramid
- Truncated square trapezohedron – 8 pentagons, 2 squares; its dual is the gyroelongated square bipyramid
- Truncated pentagonal trapezohedron or regular dodecahedron – 12 pentagonal faces; its dual is the icosahedron
- Truncated hexagonal trapezohedron – 12 pentagons, 2 hexagons; its dual is the gyroelongated hexagonal bipyramid
- ...
- Truncated n-gonal trapezohedron – 2n pentagons, 2 n-gons; their duals are the gyroelongated bipyramids

== See also ==
- Diminished trapezohedron
