= Padovan cuboid spiral =

Sequence of cuboids

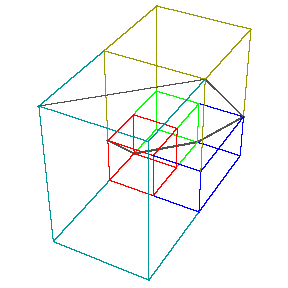
Padovan cuboid spiral

In mathematics, the Padovan cuboid spiral is the spiral created by joining the diagonals of faces of successive cuboids added to a unit cube. The cuboids are added sequentially so that the resulting cuboid has dimensions that are successive Padovan numbers.

The first cuboid is 1x1x1. The second is formed by adding to this a 1x1x1 cuboid to form a 1x1x2 cuboid. To this is added a 1x1x2 cuboid to form a 1x2x2 cuboid. This pattern continues, forming in succession a 2x2x3 cuboid, a 2x3x4 cuboid etc. Joining the diagonals of the exposed end of each new added cuboid creates a spiral (seen as the black line in the figure). The points on this spiral all lie in the same plane.

The cuboids are added in a sequence that adds to the face in the positive y direction, then the positive x direction, then the positive z direction. This is followed by cuboids added in the negative y, negative x and negative z directions. Each new cuboid added has a length and width that matches the length and width of the face being added to. The height of the nth added cuboid is the nth Padovan number.

Connecting alternate points where the spiral bends creates a series of triangles, where each triangle has two sides that are successive Padovan numbers and that has an obtuse angle of 120° between these two sides.
