= Gyroelongated square bipyramid =

Convex polyhedron with 16 triangular faces

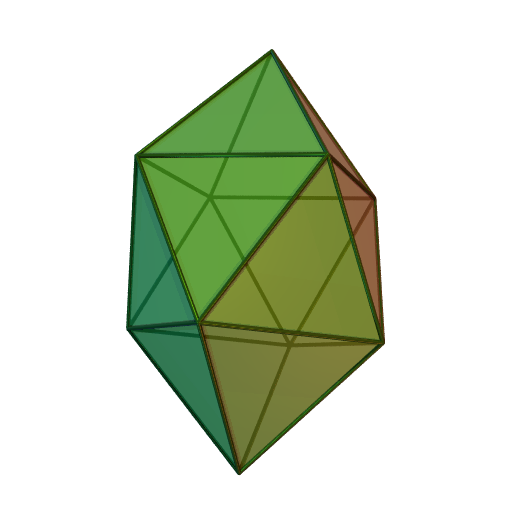
- A gyroelongated square bipyramid as a deltahedron and a Johnson solid
- Type: Gyroelongated bipyramid, Deltahedron, Johnson; J_{16} – J_{17} – J_{18}
- Faces: 16 equilateral triangles
- Edges: 24
- Vertices: 10
- Vertex configuration: $2 \times (3^4) + 8 \times (3^5)$
- Symmetry group: $D_{4d}$
- Dual polyhedron: truncated square trapezohedron
- Properties: convex, composite

The gyroelongated square bipyramid is a convex polyhedron constructed from a uniform square antiprism by attaching two equilateral square pyramids to each of its square faces. Alternative names are gyroelongated square dipyramid, hexakaidecadeltahedron, heccaidecadeltahedron, and tetrakis square antiprism. It is part of the family of gyroelongated bipyramids. It is a composite polyhedron since it can be sliced by a plane into a pyramid and a gyroelongated square pyramid, which can in turn be similarly sliced into another pyramid and a square antiprism.

By such a construction, the gyroelongated square bipyramid has 16 equilateral triangular faces. These faces can be arranged into 13,014 nets. By classification, it is a deltahedron. As a graph, a mathematical structure drawn in a plane by 10 vertices connecting 24 edges, the gyroelongated square bipyramid is one of only six deltahedral graphs in which every neighborhood is a 4- or 5-vertex cycle, forming a topological surface called a Whitney triangulation. Since equilateral triangles are regular polygons, the gyroelongated square bipyramid is a Johnson solid.

The dual polyhedron of the gyroelongated square bipyramid is a truncated square trapezohedron, which has eight pentagons and two squares as its faces. The gyroelongated square pyramid appears in chemistry as the basis for the bicapped square antiprismatic molecular geometry, and in mathematical optimization as a solution to the Thomson problem.

== Construction ==
=== Gyroelongation ===
The gyroelongated square bipyramid is a polyhedron in the family of gyroelongated bipyramids, a set of polyhedra constructed from an antiprism by attaching two pyramids onto its bases; hence the name "gyroelongation". In the case of a gyroelongated square bipyramid, the components are two square pyramids and a square antiprism. A square pyramid is a pyramid with a square base and four triangular lateral faces. A square antiprism is an antiprism with square bases and eight triangles in an alternating band connecting the bases.

3D model of a gyroelongated square bipyramid

If the edges are all equal in length, the faces of both components become equilateral triangles, where the square pyramid become equilateral and an antiprism become uniform, possessing the property of being vertex-transitive. In this case, two equilateral square pyramids cover the uniform antiprism's square bases, which are replaced with eight equilateral triangles. The resulting polyhedron has 16 equilateral triangular faces. It has 20 edges and 10 vertices. Of the ten vertices, eight of them are surrounded by five equilateral triangles as well as meeting points of five edges, and two of them by four equilateral triangles and four edges. The vertex configuration of a gyroelongated square bipyramid, a notation describing a polyhedron by the number of faces surrounding every vertex, is therefore $8 \times (3^5) + 2 \times (3^4)$.

Since its faces are all equilateral triangles, the gyroelongated square bipyramid is an example of a deltahedron, a set of polyhedra with equilateral triangular faces. There are infinitely many deltahedra, but there are eight convex deltahedra, and the gyroelongated square bipyramid is one of them. More broadly, since equilateral triangles are the regular polygons, the gyroelongated square bipyramid is an example of a Johnson solid, named after American mathematician Norman W. Johnson who listed the 92 such convex polyhedra, excluding the uniform polyhedra. In the list, the gyroelongated square bipyramid is numbered among the 92 polyhedra as the seventeenth Johnson solid $J_{17}$.

The gyroelongated square bipyramid is a composite polyhedron. A convex polyhedron is said to be composite if it can be sliced by a plane to produce smaller convex, regular-faced polyhedra. Otherwise, it is called elementary or non-composite. The gyroelongated square bipyramid can be cut twice in this manner: one cut separates an equilateral square pyramid $J_1$ from a gyroelongated square pyramid $J_{10}$, which are the first and tenth Johnson solids respectively, and a second cut separates the latter into a square antiprism and another equilateral square pyramid.

=== Cartesian coordinates ===
One possible system of Cartesian coordinates for the vertices of a gyroelongated square bipyramid as a Johnson solid, giving it edge length 2, is:
$$\begin{align}
\left(\pm 1, \pm 1, 2^{-1/4} \right),\qquad &\left(\pm \sqrt{2}, 0, -2^{-1/4} \right), \\
\left(0, \pm \sqrt{2}, -2^{-1/4} \right),\qquad &\left(0, 0, \pm \left(2^{-1/4} + \sqrt{2}\right)\right).
\end{align}$$

== Properties ==
=== Net ===
The net of a gyroelongated square bipyramid

The gyroelongated square bipyramid's faces can be unfolded into the arrangement of 16 equilateral triangles in a plane, called a net. The net of a gyroelongated square bipyramid along with the snub disphenoid thereof can be folded into the net of a regular tetrahedron. There are 13,014 ways to arrange the faces of a gyroelongated square bipyramid into nets, and 87 of them can be folded into a regular tetrahedron.

=== Measurement ===
The gyroelongated square bipyramid, as a deltahedron and a Johnson solid, has 16 identical equilateral triangular faces. The area of an equilateral triangle, for edge length $a$, is $\frac{\sqrt{3}}{4}a$. Thus, the solid's surface area is 16 times this:
$$A = 16 \frac{\sqrt{3}}{4}a^2 = 4\sqrt{3}a^2 \approx 6.928a^2.$$
Since the gyroelongated square bipyramid is made by two equilateral square pyramids and a uniform square antiprism, its volume is the total of those three solids' volume:
$$V = \frac{\sqrt{2} + \sqrt{4 + 3\sqrt{2}}}{3}a^3 \approx 1.428a^3.$$

The dihedral angle of a gyroelongated square bipyramid is similar to the gyroelongated square pyramid, by calculating the sum of the equilateral square pyramid and the square antiprism's angle in the following:

- the dihedral angle of an equilateral square pyramid between two adjacent triangles, approximately $109.47^\circ$
- the dihedral angle of a uniform square antiprism between two adjacent triangles, approximately $127.55^\circ$
- the dihedral angle between two adjacent triangles, on the edge where an equilateral square pyramid is attached to a square antiprism, is $158.57^\circ$, which is obtained by adding the dihedral angles between a square and a triangle of both the pyramid and the antiprism.

The gyroelongated square bipyramid has four types of closed geodesics. They are paths on its surface that are locally straight, avoiding vertices of the polyhedron, follow line segments across the faces that they cross, and form complementary angles on the two incident faces of each edge that they cross. The lengths are $4$, $2\sqrt{7}$, $\sqrt{19}$, and $\sqrt{21}$.

=== Symmetry ===
The gyroelongated square bipyramid has the same three-dimensional symmetry group as the square antiprism, the antiprismatic symmetry $D_{4\mathrm{d}}$ of order 16. The symmetry group has an eight-fold axis of rotation (0°, 45°, ..., 315°) passing through the bases' centroid; four two-fold axes (0° and 180°) perpendicularly passing through a pair of two opposite triangular faces, and four diagonal mirror symmetry planes passing through a pair of two opposite vertices of a square base.

=== Graph ===
The graph of a gyroelongated square bipyramid (a mathematical structure consisting of 10 vertices connecting 24 edges) is one of only six connected graphs in which the neighborhood of every vertex is a cycle of length four or five, the others being the Fritsch graph, the icosahedral graph, the octahedral graph, and the edge graphs of the pentagonal bipyramid and snub disphenoid. More generally, when every vertex in a graph has a cycle of length at least four as its neighborhood, the triangles of the graph automatically link up to form a topological surface called a Whitney triangulation. These six graphs come from the six Whitney triangulations that, when their triangles are equilateral, have positive angular defect at every vertex. This makes them a combinatorial analogue of the positively curved smooth surfaces. They come from six of the eight deltahedra—excluding the two that have a vertex with a triangular neighborhood.

== Appearances ==
The gyroelongated square bipyramid can be visualized in the geometry of chemical compounds as the atom cluster surrounding a central atom in the bicapped square antiprismatic molecular geometry. It has 10 vertices and 24 edges, corresponding to the closo polyhedron with $2n + 2$ skeletal electrons. An example is nickel carbonyl carbide anion Ni_{10}C(CO)^{2−}_{18}, a 22-skeletal-electron chemical compound with ten Ni(CO)_{2} vertices and the deficiency of two carbon monoxides.

The Thomson problem concerns the minimum-energy configuration of $n$ charged particles on a sphere. The minimum solution known for $n = 10$ places the points at the vertices of a gyroelongated square bipyramid, inscribed in a sphere.

== Dual polyhedron ==
The dual of the gyroelongated square bipyramid is from a tetragonal trapezohedron with two vertices being truncated axially

The dual polyhedron of a gyroelongated square bipyramid is a polyhedron with eight irregular pentagonal and two square faces. It is the family of truncated trapezohedra by means of truncating two axial vertices of a trapezohedron. Here, a trapezohedron refers to a polyhedron with congruent kite faces. The dual is obtained from a tetragonal trapezohedron with eight kite faces under such a procedure.

In chemistry, there is a suggestion that the isomer of fullerenes are designed to be the graphs as their bases. The dual of a gyroelongated square bipyramid, known as the barrel-shaped square fullerene, is one of the two fullerenes C_{16}; the other one is called a "tetrahedral fullerene", obtained by a half-truncated cube: cutting four of the eight vertices of a cube alternatingly such that the resulting polyhedral structure has six irregular hexagonal and four irregular triangular faces.
