= Rectangular cuboid =

Cuboid with all right angles and equal opposite faces

- Type: Prism; Plesiohedron
- Faces: 6 rectangles
- Edges: 12
- Vertices: 8
- Properties: convex, zonohedron, isogonal

A rectangular cuboid is a special case of a cuboid with rectangular faces in which all of its dihedral angles are right angles. This shape is also called rectangular parallelepiped or orthogonal parallelepiped. (Note: The terms rectangular prism and oblong prism, however, are ambiguous, since they do not specify all angles.)

Many writers just call these "cuboids", without qualifying them as being rectangular, but others use cuboid to refer to a more general class of polyhedra with six quadrilateral faces.

== Properties ==
A square rectangular prism, a special case of the rectangular prism.

A cube, a special case of the square rectangular box.

A rectangular cuboid is a convex polyhedron with six rectangle faces. The dihedral angles of a rectangular cuboid are all right angles, and its opposite faces are congruent. Because of the faces' orthogonality, the rectangular cuboid is classified as convex orthogonal polyhedron. By definition, this makes it a right rectangular prism. Rectangular cuboids may be referred to colloquially as "boxes" (after the physical object). If two opposite faces become squares, the resulting one may obtain another special case of rectangular prism, known as square rectangular cuboid. (Note: This is also called square cuboid, square box, or right square prism. However, this is sometimes ambiguously called a square prism.) They can be represented as the prism graph $\Pi_4$. (Note: The symbol $\Pi_n$ represents the skeleton of a $n$-sided prism.) In the case that all six faces are squares, the result is a cube.

If a rectangular cuboid has length $a$, width $b$, and height $c$, then:

- Its volume is the product of the rectangular area and its height:
  $$V=abc.$$
- its surface area is the sum of the area of all faces:
  $$A=2(ab+ac+bc).$$
- its space diagonal can be found by constructing a right triangle of height $c$ with its base as the diagonal of the $a$-by-$b$ rectangular face, then calculating the hypotenuse's length using the Pythagorean theorem:
  $$d=\sqrt{a^2 + b^2 + c^2}.$$

== Appearance ==
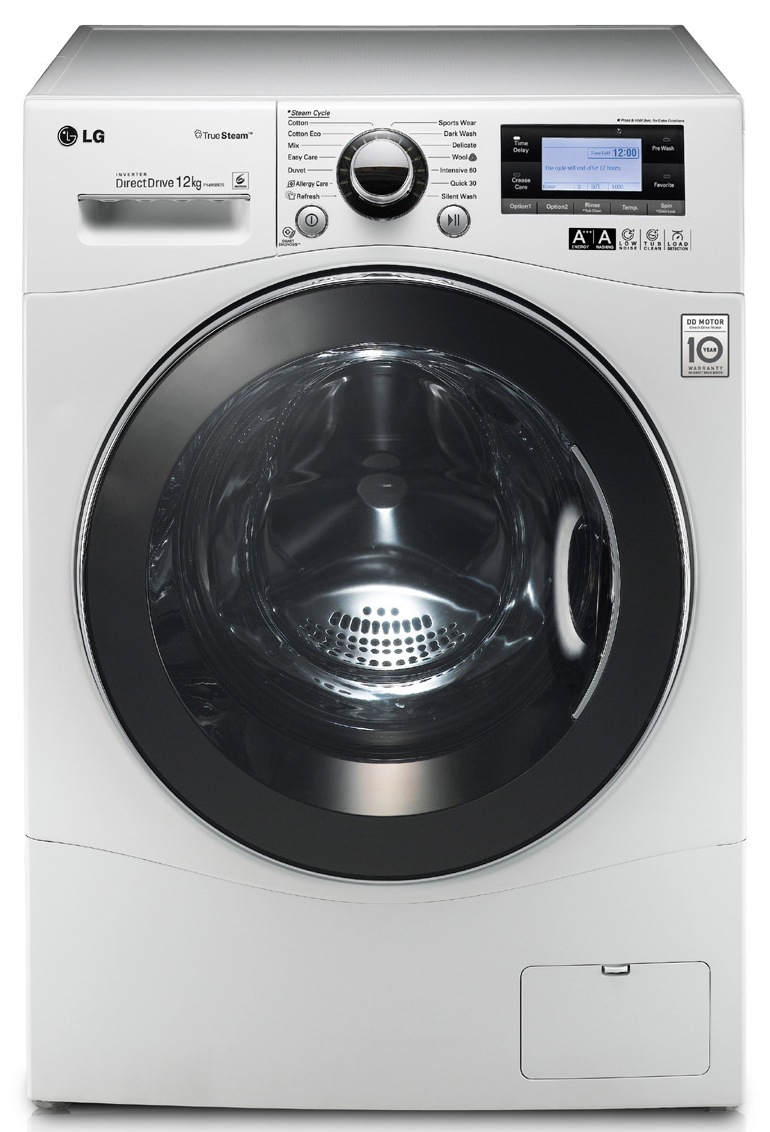
Washing machine

Rectangular cuboid shapes are often used for boxes, cupboards, rooms, buildings, cabinetry, books, sturdy computer chassis, washing and drying machines, etc. They are among those solids that can tessellate three-dimensional space. The shape is fairly versatile in being able to contain multiple smaller rectangular cuboids, e.g., sugar cubes in a box, boxes in a cupboard, cupboards in a room, and rooms in a building.

American psychologist Joy Paul Guilford modelled a three-dimensional 5×4×6 cube, called "Guilford's cube", displaying 120 possible ways of thinking apropos of the intelligence structure. Each dimension represents the mental factors, which includes five operations (cognition, memory, convergent thinking, divergent thinking, and evaluation); four contents (figural, symbolic, semantic, and behavioral); and six products (units, classes, relations, systems, transformations, and implications). An extension into a 5×5×6 cube by adding two-factor contents, which replace figural with visual and auditory, yielding 150 possible ways.

== Related polyhedra ==
A rectangular cuboid with integer edges, as well as integer face diagonals, is called an Euler brick; for example, with sides 44, 117, and 240. A perfect cuboid is an Euler brick whose space diagonal is also an integer. It is currently unknown whether a perfect cuboid actually exists.

The number of different nets for a simple cube is 11. However, this number increases significantly to at least 54 for a rectangular cuboid of three different lengths.

== See also ==
- Hyperrectangle — generalization of a rectangle;
- Minimum bounding box — a measurement of a cuboid in which all points exist;
- Padovan cuboid spiral — a spiral created by joining the diagonals of faces of successive cuboids added to a unit cube.
- The spider and the fly problem — a problem asking the shortest path between two points on a cuboid's surface.
