= Trigonal trapezohedron =

Polyhedron with 6 congruent rhombus faces

Trigonal trapezohedron
Trigonal trapezohedron
Type	trapezohedron
Conway notation	dA3
Coxeter diagram	
Faces	6 rhombi
Edges	12
Vertices	8
Face configuration	3,3,3,3
Symmetry group	D_{3d}, [2^{+},6], (2*3), order 12
Rotation group	D_{3}, [2,3]^{+}, (223), order 6
Dual polyhedron	trigonal antiprism
Properties	convex, equilateral polygon, face-transitive, zonohedron, parallelohedron

In geometry, a trigonal trapezohedron is a polyhedron with six congruent quadrilateral faces, which may be scalene or rhomboid. The variety with rhombus-shaped faces is a rhombohedron. An alternative name for the same shape is the trigonal deltohedron.

== Geometry ==
Six identical rhombic faces can construct two configurations of trigonal trapezohedra. The acute or prolate form has three acute angle corners of the rhombic faces meeting at the two polar axis vertices. The obtuse or oblate or flat form has three obtuse angle corners of the rhombic faces meeting at the two polar axis vertices.

More strongly than having all faces congruent, the trigonal trapezohedra are isohedral figures, meaning that they have symmetries that take any face to any other face.

3D model of a trigonal trapezohedron.

== Special cases ==
A cube is a special case of a trigonal trapezohedron, since a square is a special case of a rhombus.

A gyroelongated triangular bipyramid constructed with equilateral triangles can also be seen as a trigonal trapezohedron when its coplanar triangles are merged into rhombi.

The two golden rhombohedra are the acute and obtuse form of the trigonal trapezohedron with golden rhombus faces. Copies of these can be assembled to form other convex polyhedra with golden rhombus faces, including the Bilinski dodecahedron and rhombic triacontahedron.

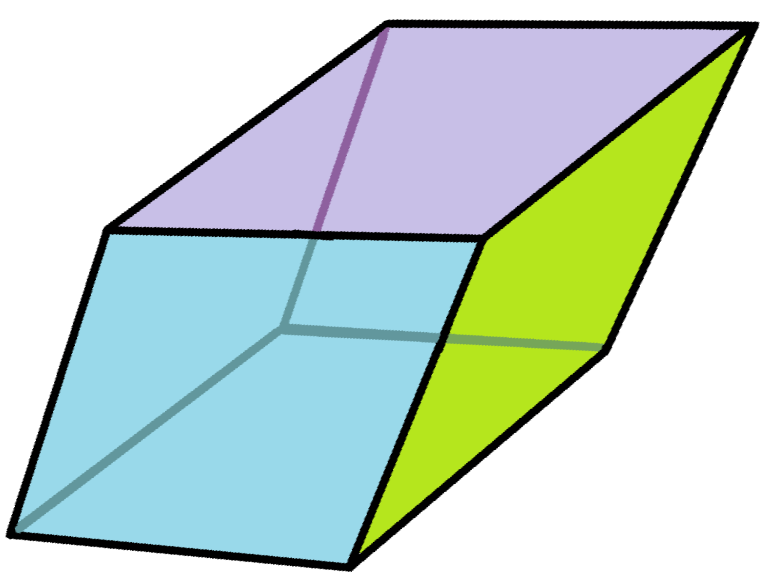
Acute golden rhombohedron

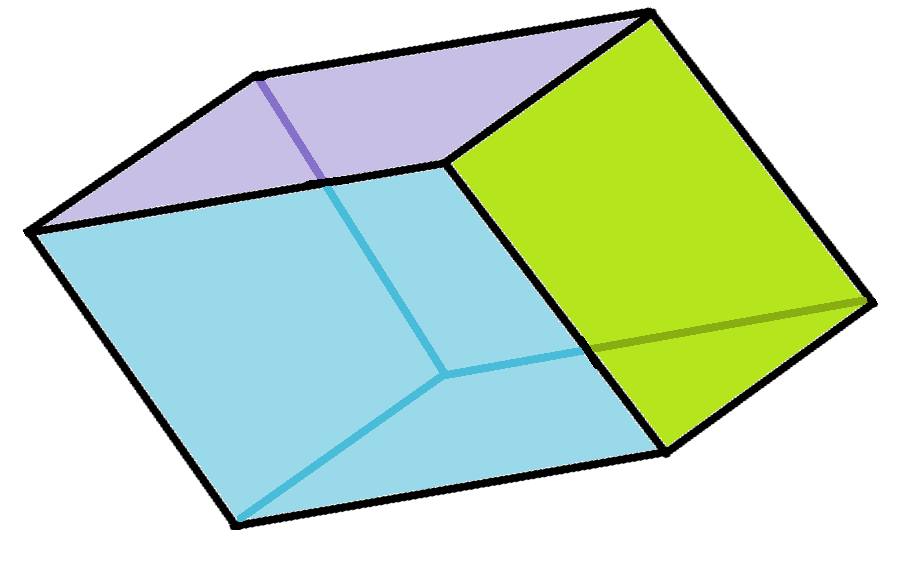
Obtuse golden rhombohedron

Four oblate rhombohedra whose ratio of face diagonal lengths are the square root of two can be assembled to form a rhombic dodecahedron. The same rhombohedra also tile space in the trigonal trapezohedral honeycomb.

== Related polyhedra ==
The trigonal trapezohedra are special cases of trapezohedra, polyhedra with an even number of congruent kite-shaped faces. When this number of faces is six, the kites degenerate to rhombi, and the result is a trigonal trapezohedron. As with the rhombohedra more generally, the trigonal trapezohedra are also special cases of parallelepipeds, and are the only parallelepipeds with six congruent faces. Parallelepipeds are zonohedra, and Evgraf Fedorov proved that the trigonal trapezohedra are the only infinite family of zonohedra whose faces are all congruent rhombi.

Dürer's solid is generally presumed to be a truncated triangular trapezohedron, a trigonal trapezohedron with two opposite vertices truncated, although its precise shape is still a matter for debate.

== See also ==
- Truncated triangular trapezohedron

Family of n-gonal trapezohedra
Trapezohedron name	Digonal trapezohedron (Tetrahedron)	Trigonal trapezohedron	Tetragonal trapezohedron	Pentagonal trapezohedron	Hexagonal trapezohedron	...	Apeirogonal trapezohedron
Polyhedron image						...	
Spherical tiling image						Plane tiling image	
Face configuration	V2.3.3.3	V3.3.3.3	V4.3.3.3	V5.3.3.3	V6.3.3.3	...	V∞.3.3.3
