= Fixed points of isometry groups in Euclidean space =

A fixed point of an isometry group is a point that is a fixed point for every isometry in the group. For any isometry group in Euclidean space the set of fixed points is either empty or an affine space.

For an object, any unique centre and, more generally, any point with unique properties with respect to the object is a fixed point of its symmetry group.

In particular this applies for the centroid of a figure, if it exists. In the case of a physical body, if for the symmetry not only the shape but also the density is taken into account, it applies to the centre of mass.

If the set of fixed points of the symmetry group of an object is a singleton then the object has a specific centre of symmetry. The centroid and centre of mass, if defined, are this point. Another meaning of "centre of symmetry" is a point with respect to which inversion symmetry applies. Such a point needs not be unique; if it is not, there is translational symmetry, hence there are infinitely many of such points. On the other hand, in the cases of e.g. C_{3h} and D_{2} symmetry there is a centre of symmetry in the first sense, but no inversion.

If the symmetry group of an object has no fixed points then the object is infinite and its centroid and centre of mass are undefined.

If the set of fixed points of the symmetry group of an object is a line or plane then the centroid and centre of mass of the object, if defined, and any other point that has unique properties with respect to the object, are on this line or plane.

== 1D ==
Line
Only the trivial isometry group leaves the whole line fixed.

Point
The groups generated by a reflection leave a point fixed.

== 2D ==
Plane
Only the trivial isometry group C_{1} leaves the whole plane fixed.

Line
C_{s} with respect to any line leaves that line fixed.

Point
The point groups in two dimensions with respect to any point leave that point fixed.

== 3D ==
Space
Only the trivial isometry group C_{1} leaves the whole space fixed.

Plane
C_{s} with respect to a plane leaves that plane fixed.

Line
Isometry groups leaving a line fixed are isometries which in every plane perpendicular to that line have common 2D point groups in two dimensions with respect to the point of intersection of the line and the planes.
- C_{n} ( n > 1 ) and C_{nv} ( n > 1 )
- cylindrical symmetry without reflection symmetry in a plane perpendicular to the axis
- cases in which the symmetry group is an infinite subset of that of cylindrical symmetry

Point
All other point groups in three dimensions

No fixed points
The isometry group contains translations or a screw operation.

== Arbitrary dimension ==
Point
One example of an isometry group, applying in every dimension, is that generated by inversion in a point. An n-dimensional parallelepiped is an example of an object invariant under such an inversion.
