= Richard Padovan =

British architect (born 1935)

Richard Padovan (born 1935) is an architect, author, translator and lecturer. In the 1950s he studied at the Architectural Association School of Architecture; he has practised architecture in several European countries, and taught at the University of Bath and Buckinghamshire College of Higher Education. He is the namesake of the Padovan sequence.

== Van der Laan ==
Padovan became fascinated with the works of Hans van der Laan after being sent van der Laan's book De architectonische ruimte to review because of his knowledge of the Dutch language. He visited van der Laan beginning in 1980, and continued to correspond with him afterward. He became the translator of the book into English as Architectonic Space: Fifteen Lessons on the Disposition of the Human Habitat (1983), and wrote the book Dom Hans van der Laan: modern primitive (1989) about van der Laan.

== Padovan numbers ==
In his book on van der Laan, Padovan described the Padovan sequence of numbers

1, 1, 1, 2, 2, 3, 4, 5, 7, 9, 12, 16, 21, 28, 37, 49, 65, 86, 114, 151, 200, 265, ... (sequence A000931 in the OEIS)

defined by a recurrence relation

$$P(n)=P(n-2)+P(n-3)$$

and having properties similar to the Fibonacci numbers. These numbers were named after Padovan by Ian Stewart, despite Padovan's attribution of the sequence to van der Laan.

== Other works ==
Padovan is also the author of the book Proportion: science, philosophy, architecture (1999) on the mathematics and philosophy of architectural proportion and proportion systems. One of his arguments in the book is that the use of the golden ratio in architecture is modern, rather than being used for this purpose by the ancient Greeks. He also wrote Towards universality: Le Corbusier, Mies, and De Stijl (2002), about the push to remove individuality from architecture through the works of Le Corbusier, Ludwig Mies van der Rohe, and the Dutch art and architectural movement De Stijl.
