= Gyroelongated bipyramid =

Polyhedron formed by capping an antiprism with pyramids

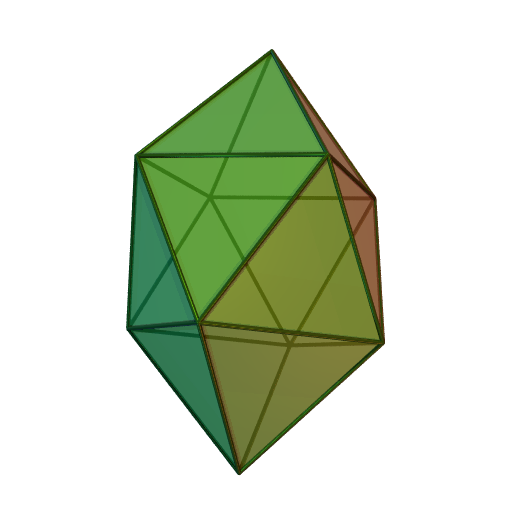
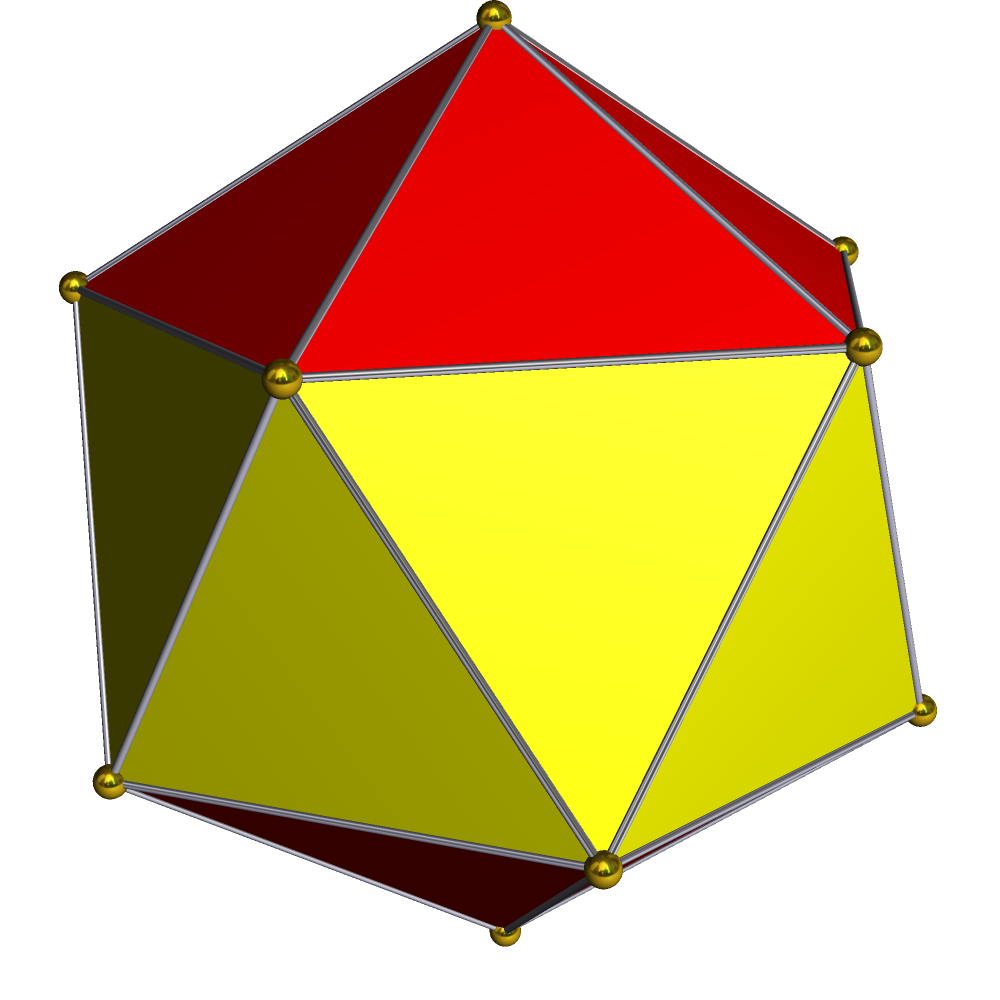
Special members in the family of gyroelongated bipyramids

The gyroelongated bipyramids are the polyhedra constructed with a bipyramid and an antiprism. Their dual polyhedra are the truncated trapezohedra. The bipyramid is sliced into two congruent pyramids and then attached to the bases of an antiprism in between; such a process of construction is known as gyroelongation. The resulting construction has triangular faces, classified as simplicial polyhedron. There are infinitely many members of gyroelongated bipyramids.

Some members are special cases for having equilateral triangular faces, which are known as deltahedra: the gyroelongated square bipyramid and regular icosahedron. For a gyroelongated triangular bipyramid, it is a non-convex deltahedron because its faces are coplanar, thereby it is not strictly convex. Considering that each pair of its triangles merged into rhombi, the resulting polyhedron can be seen as a trigonal trapezohedron.
