= Pentagonal trapezohedron =

Polyhedron with 10 faces

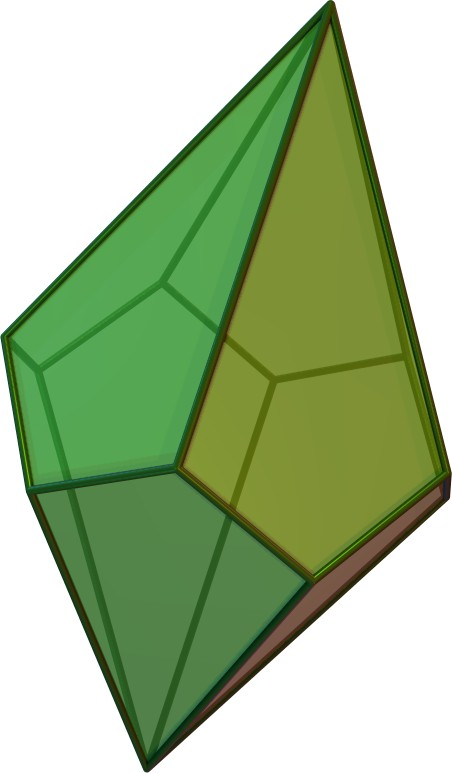
- Type: Trapezohedra
- Faces: 10 kites
- Edges: 20
- Vertices: 12
- Symmetry group: $D_{5\mathrm{d}}$
- Dual polyhedron: pentagonal antiprism
- Properties: convex, face-transitive

In geometry, a pentagonal trapezohedron is the third in the infinite family of trapezohedra, face-transitive polyhedra. Its dual polyhedron is the pentagonal antiprism. As a decahedron it has ten faces which are congruent kites.

One particular pentagonal trapezohedron can be decomposed into two pentagonal pyramids and a regular dodecahedron in the middle.

== Properties ==
3D model of a pentagonal trapezohedron

The pentagonal trapezohedron has ten quadrilaterals, twenty edges, and twelve vertices. Each face is a kite, with one version having its three interior angles at 108° and one interior angle at 36°. Truncating both top and bottom vertices of this polyhedron achieves the regular dodecahedron.

The dual of a pentagonal trapezohedron is the pentagonal antiprism, an antiprism with pentagonal bases connected by alternating band of triangles. It has the same three-dimensional symmetry group as the pentagonal antiprism, the five-fold antiprismatic symmetry $D_{5\mathrm{d}}$ of order 20.

== 10-sided dice ==
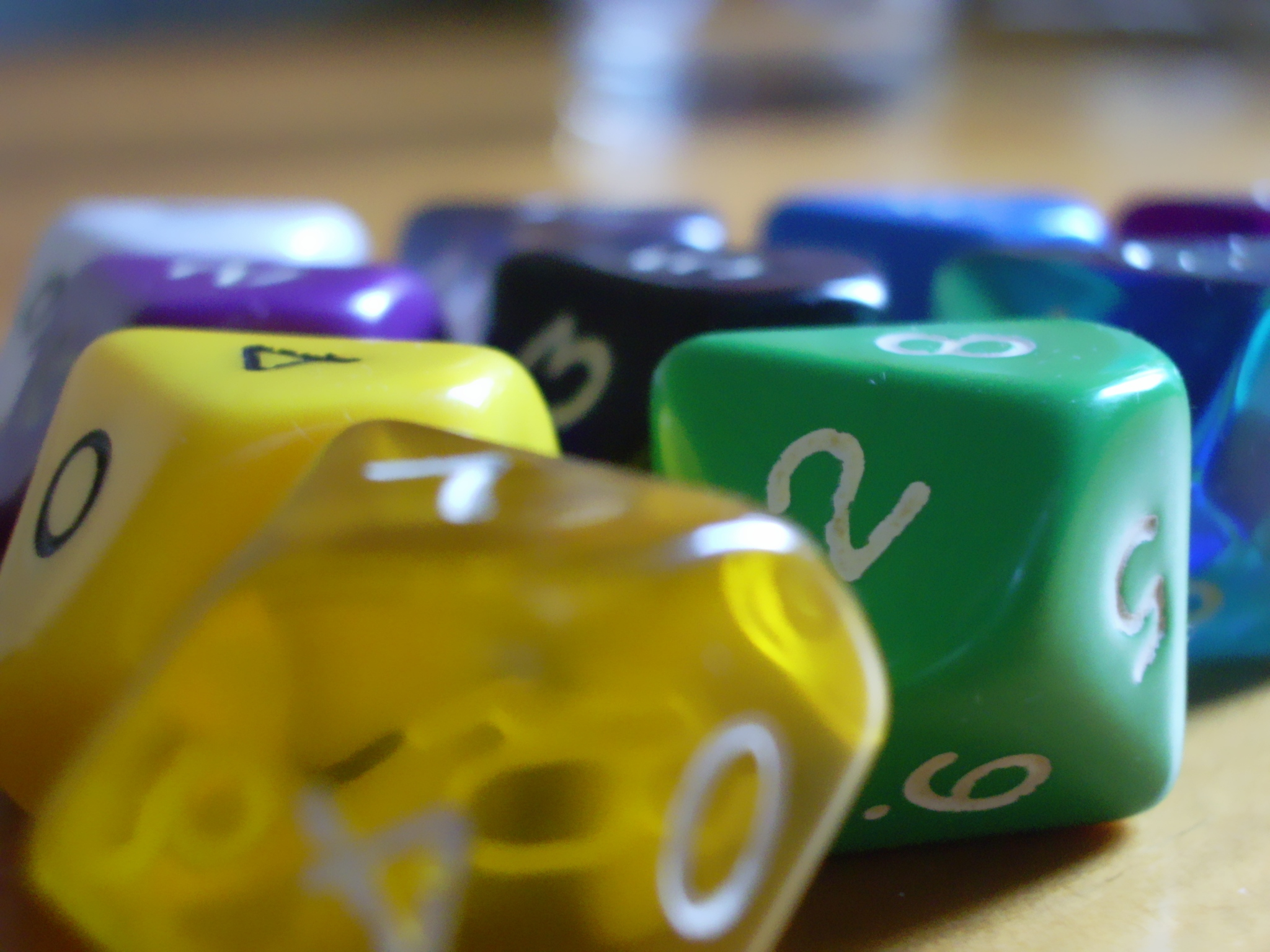
Ten-sided dice

The pentagonal trapezohedron was patented for use as a gaming die (i.e. "game apparatus") in 1906. These dice are used for role-playing games that use percentile-based skills; however, a twenty-sided die can be labeled with the numbers 0-9 twice to use for percentages instead. This version of the pentagonal trapezohedron has an additional constraint, namely that all vertices are on the surface of a sphere. One consequence of this is that the kite faces have two internal angles equal to 90°.

Subsequent patents on ten-sided dice have made minor refinements to the basic design by rounding or truncating the edges. This enables the die to tumble so that the outcome is less predictable. One such refinement became notorious at the 1980 Gen Con when the patent was incorrectly thought to cover ten-sided dice in general.

Ten-sided dice are commonly numbered from 0 to 9, as this allows two to be rolled in order to easily obtain a percentile result. Where one die represents the 'tens', the other represents 'units' therefore a result of 7 on the former and 0 on the latter would be combined to produce 70. A result of double-zero is commonly interpreted as 100. Some ten-sided dice (often called 'Percentile Dice') are sold in sets of two where one is numbered from 0 to 9 and the other from 00 to 90 in increments of 10, thus making it impossible to misinterpret which one is the tens and which the units die. Ten-sided dice may also be marked 1 to 10 when a random number in this range is desirable.

== Spherical tiling ==
The pentagonal trapezohedron also exists as a spherical tiling, with 2 vertices on the poles, and alternating vertices equally spaced above and below the equator.

== Sources ==
- Cundy, H. M.; Rollett, A. P. (1981). Mathematical models (3rd ed.). Tarquin. p. 117.
- Alsina, Claudi; Nelsen, Roger B. (2020). "Section 3.4: Kites". A Cornucopia of Quadrilaterals. The Dolciani Mathematical Expositions. Vol. 55. Providence, Rhode Island: MAA Press and American Mathematical Society. pp. 73–78. ISBN 978-1-4704-5312-1. MR 4286138.
