= Rhombohedron =

Polyhedron with six rhombi as faces

Rhombohedron
Rhombohedron
| Type | prism |
| Faces | 6 rhombi |
| Edges | 12 |
| Vertices | 8 |
| Symmetry group | C_{i} , [2^{+},2^{+}], (×), order 2 |
| Properties | convex, equilateral, zonohedron, parallelohedron |

In geometry, a rhombohedron (also called a rhombic hexahedron or, inaccurately, a rhomboid (Note: More accurately, rhomboid is a two-dimensional figure.)) is a special case of a parallelepiped in which all six faces are congruent rhombi. It can be used to define the rhombohedral lattice system, a honeycomb with rhombohedral cells. A rhombohedron has two opposite apices at which all face angles are equal; a prolate rhombohedron has this common angle acute, and an oblate rhombohedron has an obtuse angle at these vertices. A cube is a special case of a rhombohedron with all sides square.

== Special cases ==
The common angle at the two apices is here given as $\theta$. There are two general forms of the rhombohedron: oblate (flattened) and prolate (stretched).

| Oblate rhombohedron | Prolate rhombohedron |

In the oblate case $\theta > 90^\circ$ and in the prolate case $\theta < 90^\circ$. For $\theta = 90^\circ$ the figure is a cube.

Certain proportions of the rhombs give rise to some well-known special cases. These typically occur in both prolate and oblate forms.

| Form | Cube | √2 Rhombohedron | Golden Rhombohedron |
|---|---|---|---|
| Angle constraints | $\theta=90^\circ$ | | |
| Ratio of diagonals | 1 | √2 | Golden ratio |
| Occurrence | Regular solid | Dissection of the rhombic dodecahedron | Dissection of the rhombic triacontahedron |

== Solid geometry ==
For a unit (i.e.: with side length 1) rhombohedron, with rhombic acute angle $\theta~$, with one vertex at the origin (0, 0, 0), and with one edge lying along the x-axis, the three generating vectors are

e_{1} : $\biggl(1, 0, 0\biggr),$

e_{2} : $\biggl(\cos\theta, \sin\theta, 0\biggr),$

e_{3} : $\biggl(\cos\theta, {\cos\theta-\cos^2\theta\over \sin\theta}, {\sqrt{1-3\cos^2\theta+2\cos^3\theta} \over \sin\theta} \biggr).$

The other coordinates can be obtained from vector addition of the 3 direction vectors: e_{1} + e_{2} , e_{1} + e_{3} , e_{2} + e_{3} , and e_{1} + e_{2} + e_{3} .

The volume $V$ of a rhombohedron, in terms of its side length $a$ and its rhombic acute angle $\theta~$, is a simplification of the volume of a parallelepiped, and is given by

$$V = a^3(1-\cos\theta)\sqrt{1+2\cos\theta} = a^3\sqrt{(1-\cos\theta)^2(1+2\cos\theta)} = a^3\sqrt{1-3\cos^2\theta+2\cos^3\theta}~.$$

We can express the volume $V$ another way :

$$V = 2\sqrt{3} ~ a^3 \sin^2\left(\frac{\theta}{2}\right)  \sqrt{1-\frac{4}{3}\sin^2\left(\frac{\theta}{2}\right)}~.$$

As the area of the (rhombic) base is given by $a^2\sin\theta~$, and as the height of a rhombohedron is given by its volume divided by the area of its base, the height $h$ of a rhombohedron in terms of its side length $a$ and its rhombic acute angle $\theta$ is given by

$$h = a~{(1-\cos\theta)\sqrt{1+2\cos\theta} \over \sin\theta} = a~{\sqrt{1-3\cos^2\theta+2\cos^3\theta} \over \sin\theta}~.$$

Note:

$h = a~z$_{3} , where $z$_{3} is the third coordinate of e_{3} .

The body diagonal between the acute-angled vertices is the longest. By rotational symmetry about that diagonal, the other three body diagonals, between the three pairs of opposite obtuse-angled vertices, are all the same length.

=== Relation to orthocentric tetrahedra ===
Four points forming non-adjacent vertices of a rhombohedron necessarily form the four vertices of an orthocentric tetrahedron, and all orthocentric tetrahedra can be formed in this way.

== Rhombohedral lattice ==
The rhombohedral lattice system has rhombohedral cells, with 6 congruent rhombic faces forming a trigonal trapezohedron:

== See also ==
- Lists of shapes
