= Hemi-cuboctahedron =

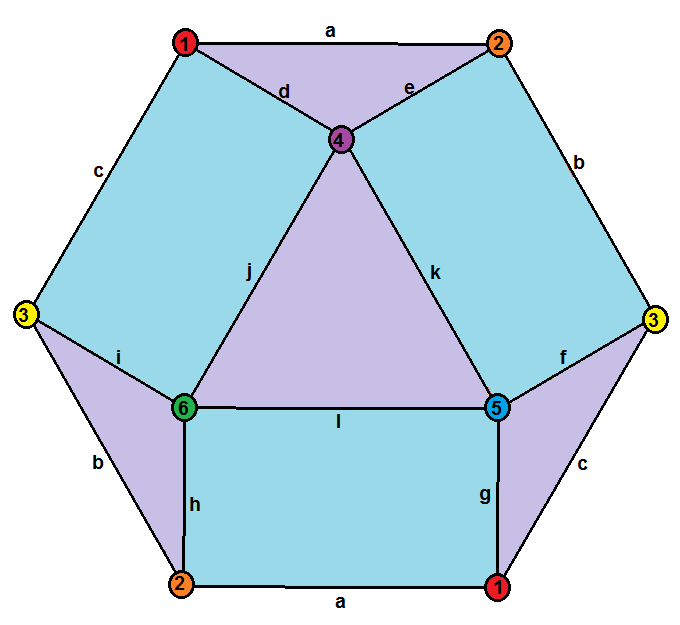
- Schlegel diagram
- Type: abstract polyhedron globally projective polyhedron
- Faces: 7: 4 triangles 3 squares
- Edges: 12
- Vertices: 6
- Vertex configuration: 3.4.3.4
- Schläfli symbol: r{3,4}/2 or r{3,4}_{3}
- Symmetry group: S_{4}, order 24
- Properties: non-orientable Euler characteristic 1

A hemi-cuboctahedron is an abstract polyhedron, containing half the faces of a semiregular cuboctahedron.

It has 4 triangular faces and 3 square faces, 12 edges, and 6 vertices. It can be seen as a rectified hemi-octahedron or rectified hemi-cube.

Its skeleton matches 6 vertices and 12 edges of a regular octahedron.

It can be realized as a projective polyhedron (a tessellation of the real projective plane by 4 triangles and 3 square), which can be visualized by constructing the projective plane as a hemisphere where opposite points along the boundary are connected.

== Dual ==
Its dual polyhedron is a rhombic hemi-dodecahedron which has 7 vertices (1-7), 12 edges (a-l), and 6 rhombic faces (A-F).

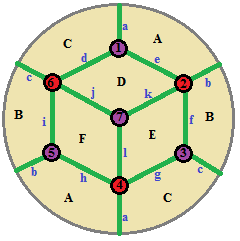

== Related polyhedra ==
It has a real presentation as a uniform star polyhedron, the tetrahemihexahedron.

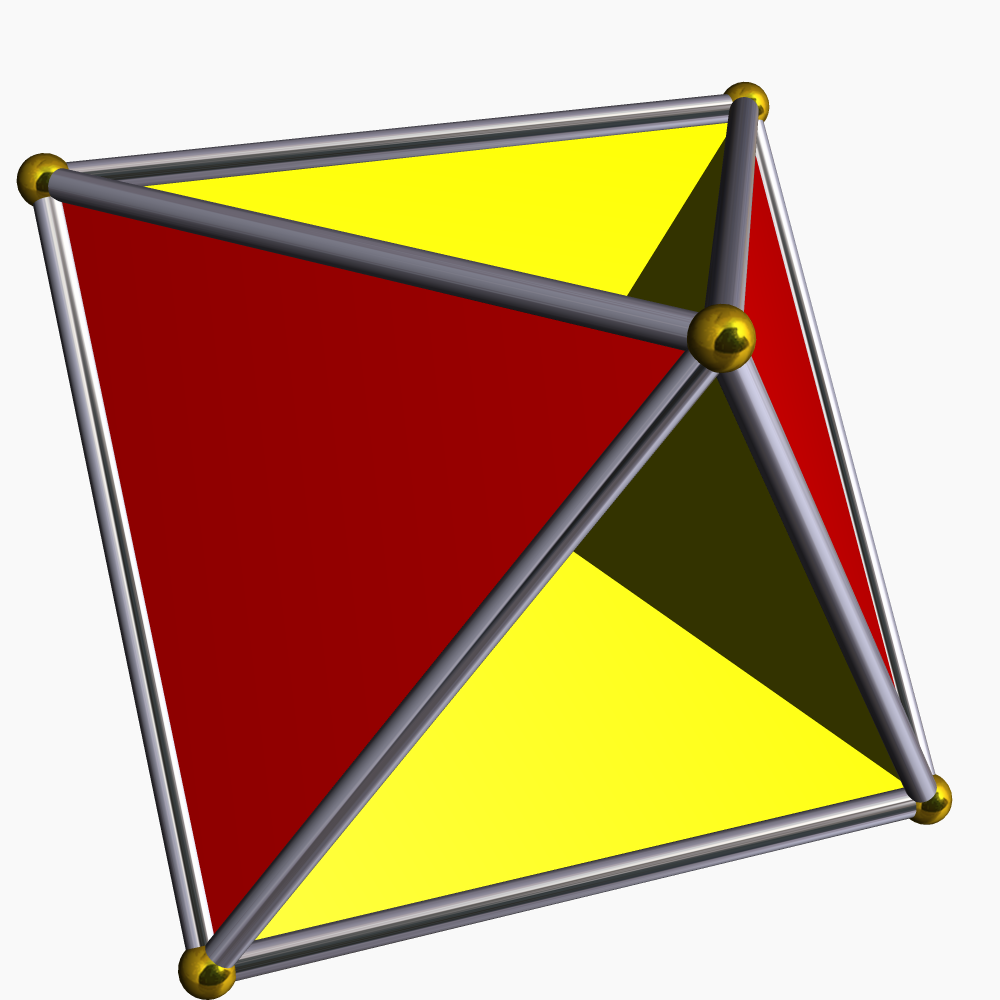

== See also ==
- Hemi-dodecahedron
- Hemi-icosahedron
