= Polyhedroid =

Polyhedroid may refer to:

- A 4-polytope
- A form of agate crystal
