= Perkel graph =

6-regular graph with 57 vertices and 171 edges

- Perkel graphs with 19-fold symmetry
- Vertices: 57
- Edges: 171
- Radius: 3
- Diameter: 3
- Girth: 5
- Automorphisms: 3420
- Chromatic number: 3
- Properties: Regular, distance-transitive

In mathematics, the Perkel graph, named after Manley Perkel, is a 6-regular graph with 57 vertices and 171 edges. It is the unique distance-regular graph with intersection array (6, 5, 2; 1, 1, 3). The Perkel graph is also distance-transitive.

It is also the skeleton of an abstract regular polytope, the 57-cell.

The vertex set is Z_{3} × Z_{19} where (i,j) is joined to (i+1,k) when (k−j)^{3} = 2^{6i}.
