= Spherical polyhedron =

Partition of a sphere's surface into polygons

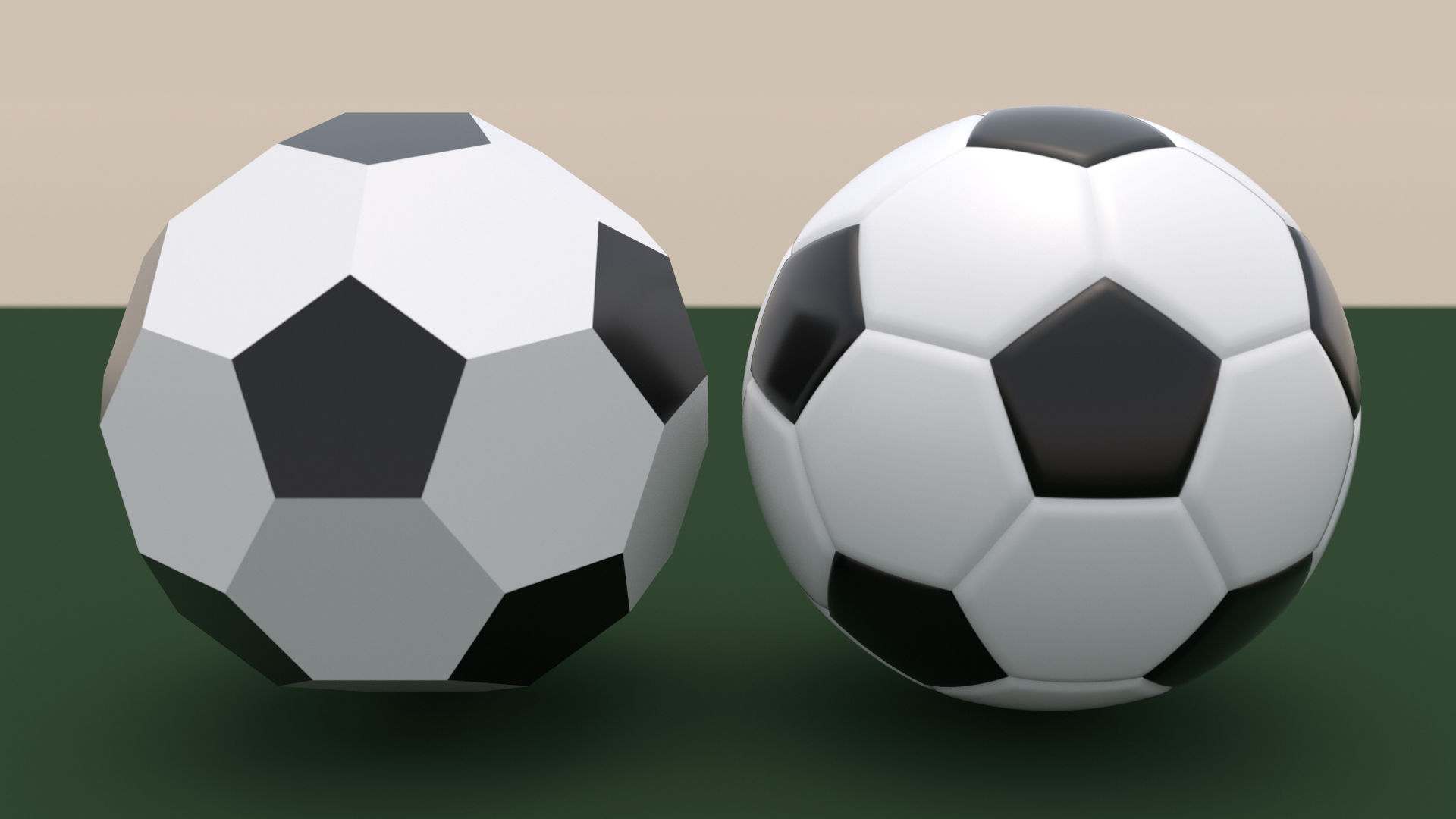
A familiar spherical polyhedron is the football, thought of as a spherical truncated icosahedron.

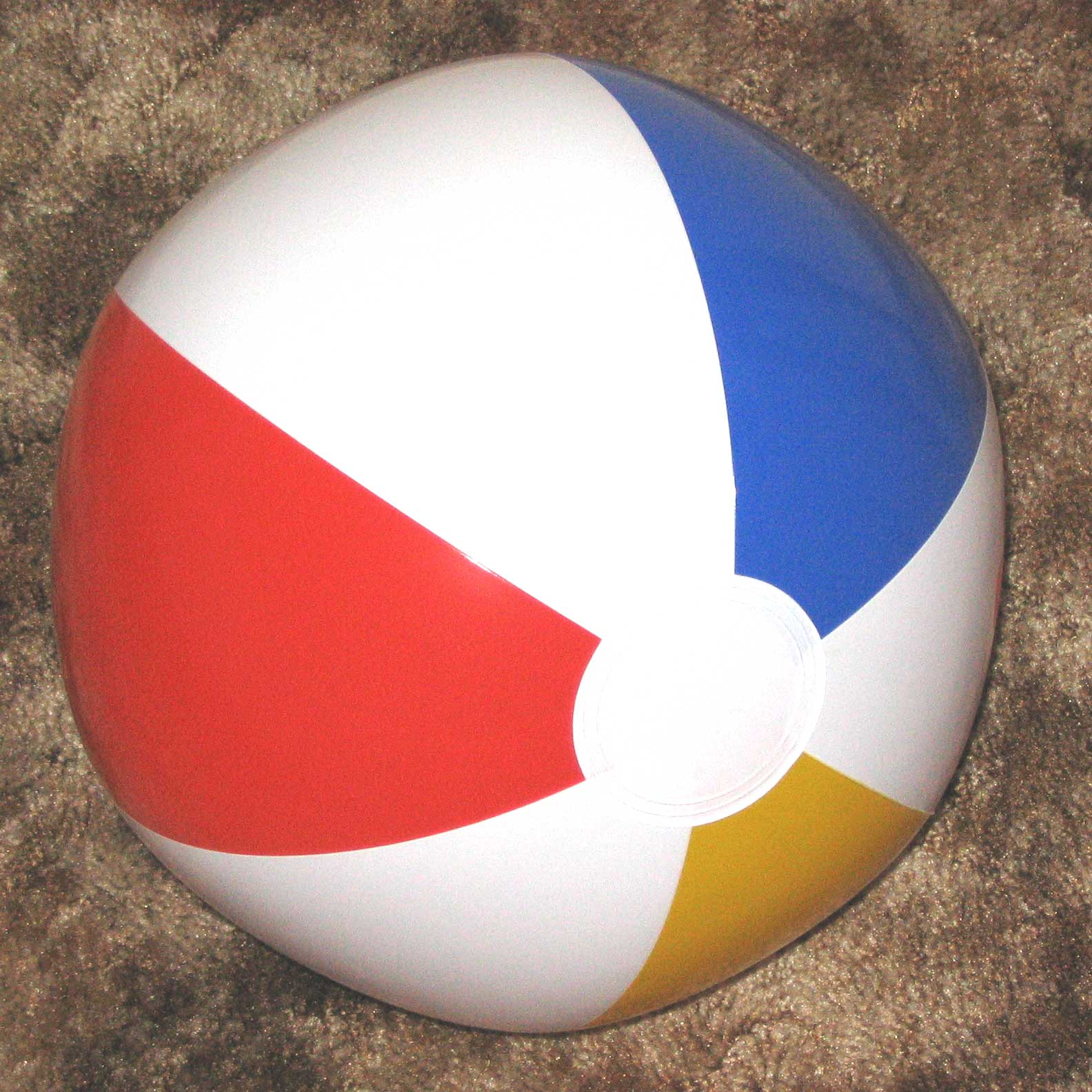
This beach ball would be a hosohedron with 6 spherical lune faces if the 2 white caps on the ends were removed.

A quadrilateralized spherical cube projection in mapmaking

In geometry, a spherical polyhedron or spherical tiling is a tiling of the sphere in which the surface is divided or partitioned by great arcs into bounded regions called spherical polygons. A polyhedron whose vertices are equidistant from its center can be conveniently studied by projecting its edges onto the sphere to obtain a corresponding spherical polyhedron.

The most familiar spherical polyhedron is the soccer ball, thought of as a spherical truncated icosahedron. The next most popular spherical polyhedron is the beach ball, thought of as a hosohedron.

Some cases of three-dimensional polyhedra are unique to spherical forms, such as hosohedra and their duals, dihedra, whose flat-faced convex analogs are degenerate. The example hexagonal beach ball, $\{2, 6\}$ is a hosohedron, and $\{6, 2\}$ is its dual dihedron.

== History ==
During the 10th Century, the Islamic scholar Abū al-Wafā' Būzjānī (Abu'l Wafa) studied spherical polyhedra as part of a work on the geometry needed by craftspeople and architects.

The work of Buckminster Fuller on geodesic domes in the mid 20th century triggered a boom in the study of spherical polyhedra. At roughly the same time, Coxeter used them to enumerate all but one of the uniform polyhedra, through the construction of kaleidoscopes (Wythoff construction).

== As a projection ==
Geometric tilings on the sphere $\mathbb{S}^{2}$ can be mapped from a closed surface in $\mathbb{R}^{3}$ such as a convex polyhedron through symmetries found on $\mathbb{S}^{2}$, specifically under reflection through its center. This means that projecting the edges of an inscribed flat-faced polyhedron onto its circumscribing sphere results in a tiling on the sphere that is isomorphic to the original polyhedron. The reverse action mapping from the sphere onto the plane is a stereographic projection, which is particularly relevant when describing symmetries of spherical polyhedra in terms of uniform tilings of the plane (e.g., as for the regular square tiling and the spherical snub cube, with vertex figures of $3.3.3.4$). A Schlegel diagram serves this purpose, as it is used to project a flat three-dimensional polyhedron onto the plane by first mapping it on the circumscribing sphere's surface, then on the plane.

=== Classifications ===
In a homeomeric type of spherical tiling, the symmetry group acts identically on components via central projection across the three major transitivity classes of isotoxal, isogonal, and isohedral symmetries. This corresponds to the regular and semiregular solids with tetrahedral, octahedral, and icosahedral symmetry, as well as the infinite families (with at least three sides) of dihedra and hosohedra, bipyramids, trapezohedra, prisms and antiprisms.

Limiting choices to the list of spherical polyhedra which admit regular convex faces only, with or without transitivity, gives:

- 5 Platonic solids,
- 13 Archimedean solids,
- 25 Johnson solids, (Note: These are the circumscribable solids with regular faces, yet no transitive properties: 6 pyramids and elongations: J_{1}, J_{2}, J_{7}, J_{8}, J_{9}, and J_{11}. 2 dipyramids: J_{13}, and J_{17}. 8 cupolae, rotundae, and their elongations: J_{3}, J_{4}, J_{5}, J_{6}, J_{18}, J_{19}, J_{20}, and J_{21}. 9 combined bicupolae, birotundae, and cupola-rotundae: J_{22}, J_{23}, J_{24}, J_{25}, J_{30}, J_{31}, J_{32}, J_{33}, J_{34}.)
- 2 infinite series of regular prisms and antiprisms, and
- 2 infinite series of regular dihedra and hosohedra

In total, these are 47 cases of spherical polyhedra (some of which represent infinite families, as for example the dihedra of the form $\{n,2\}$ for $n\ge{2}$) that can be projected as tilings from flat-faced forms in Euclidean space, using regular spherical polygons exclusively. (Note: Using graph theory, Akama et al. (2018) was able show which combinations of regular polyhedra from the classical flat-faced analogues can be projected onto the sphere without generating gaps and overlaps from the angular excess/defect that occurs when projecting flat polygons onto the surface of a sphere.Their list omits the infinite families of dihedra and their duals that are degenerate in flat, three-dimensional space. In the traditional sense, hosohedra and dihedra classify as regular spherical polyhedra, but from an Euclidean perspective, they are degenerate, without depth or height, which is sometimes why as a series they are excluded from consideration, as have Akama et al.) In the set of Johnson solids, 3 of 25 solids which are inscribable inside a sphere produce vertex angles that are greater than the hemispheric angle, when projected onto $\mathbb{S}^{2}$ (specifically, the pentagonal pyramid J_{2}, the square cupola J_{4} and the pentagonal cupola J_{5}). As such, they represent the only spherical polyhedra with regular faces to have vertex angles greater than the hemispheric angle.

=== Relation to tilings of the projective plane ===
The sphere contains a rotational symmetry of order two that acts as the universal covering space of the projective plane, where any tiling on a sphere has a double covering map on the real projective plane $\mathbb{RP}^{2}$. The best-known examples of projective polyhedra are the regular projective types, as quotients of centrally symmetric Platonic solids, and the two infinite classes of even dihedra and hosohedra; i.e., the hemi-cube, hemi-octahedron, hemi-dodecahedron, hemi-icosahedron, hemi-dihedron $\{2p,2\}/2$ and hemi-hosohedron $\{2,2p\}/2$, for $p\geq{1}.$

== Symmetry groups ==
Examples of uniform edge-to-edge tilings on the sphere $\mathbb{S}^{2}$ in three-dimensional space which contain dihedral $\operatorname{D}_{n}$, tetrahedral $\operatorname{T}_{d}$, octahedral $\operatorname{O}_{h}$, and icosahedral $\operatorname{I}_{h}$ symmetries:

Schläfli symbol	{p,q}	t{p,q}	r{p,q}	t{q,p}	{q,p}	rr{p,q}	tr{p,q}	sr{p,q}
Vertex config.	p^{q}	q.2p.2p	p.q.p.q	p.2q.2q	q^{p}	q.4.p.4	4.2q.2p	3.3.q.3.p
Tetrahedral symmetry (3 3 2)	3^{3}	3.6.6	3.3.3.3	3.6.6	3^{3}	3.4.3.4	4.6.6	3.3.3.3.3
Tetrahedral symmetry (3 3 2)	3^{3}	V3.6.6	V3.3.3.3	V3.6.6	3^{3}	V3.4.3.4	V4.6.6	V3.3.3.3.3
Octahedral symmetry (4 3 2)	4^{3}	3.8.8	3.4.3.4	4.6.6	3^{4}	3.4.4.4	4.6.8	3.3.3.3.4
Octahedral symmetry (4 3 2)	4^{3}	V3.8.8	V3.4.3.4	V4.6.6	3^{4}	V3.4.4.4	V4.6.8	V3.3.3.3.4
Icosahedral symmetry (5 3 2)	5^{3}	3.10.10	3.5.3.5	5.6.6	3^{5}	3.4.5.4	4.6.10	3.3.3.3.5
Icosahedral symmetry (5 3 2)	5^{3}	V3.10.10	V3.5.3.5	V5.6.6	3^{5}	V3.4.5.4	V4.6.10	V3.3.3.3.5
Dihedral example (p=6) (2 2 6)	6^{2}	2.12.12	2.6.2.6	6.4.4	2^{6}	2.4.6.4	4.4.12	3.3.3.6

Examples of spherical polyhedra which have prismatic, pyramidal, and trapezohedral symmetry:

n	2	3	4	5	6	7	...
n-Prism (2 2 p)							...
n-Bipyramid (2 2 p)							...
n-Antiprism							...
n-Trapezohedron							...

== Dihedra and hosohedra ==
Tilings on the sphere allow for unique cases that non-spherical polyhedra do not, namely hosohedral figures $\{2,n\}$, and dihedra of the form $\{n,2\}$; they have the simplest full orders of symmetry among spherical polyhedra, dihedral symmetry $\operatorname{D}_{n}$.

Family of regular hosohedra · *n22 symmetry mutations of regular hosohedral tilings: nn
Space	Spherical					Euclidean
Tiling name	Digonal hosohedron	Trigonal hosohedron	Square hosohedron	Pentagonal hosohedron	...	Apeirogonal hosohedron
Tiling image					...	
Schläfli symbol	{2,2}	{2,3}	{2,4}	{2,5}	...	{2,∞}
Coxeter diagram					...	
Faces and edges	2	3	4	5	...	∞
Vertices	2	2	2	2	...	2
Vertex config.	2.2	2^{3}	2^{4}	2^{5}	...	2^{∞}

Family of regular dihedra · *n22 symmetry mutations of regular dihedral tilings: nn
Space	Spherical					Euclidean
Tiling name	Digonal dihedron	Trigonal dihedron	Square dihedron	Pentagonal dihedron	...	Apeirogonal dihedron
Tiling image					...	
Schläfli symbol	{2,2}	{3,2}	{4,2}	{5,2}	...	{∞,2}
Coxeter diagram					...	
Faces	2 {2}	2 {3}	2 {4}	2 {5}	...	2 {∞}
Edges and vertices	2	3	4	5	...	∞
Vertex config.	2.2	3.3	4.4	5.5	...	∞.∞

== Non edge-to-edge cases ==
Tilings of the sphere by regular spherical polygons of three or more sides which do not fit edge-to-edge were formally classified by Adams et al. in 2024. There are 31 forms, some of which are rigid. They fall into five or six main classes:

- Kaleidoscope tilings (5 non-rigid),
- 2-hemisphere tilings (13 non-rigid),
- Lunar tilings (4 rigid),
- Sporadic tilings (3 rigid),
- Composed tilings (5 rigid), and the
- Magic triangle tiling (1 rigid)

=== Kaleidoscope tilings ===
In a triangle-triangle spherical kaleidoscope tiling, two regular triangles of different sizes that tessellate on the sphere can have their sides increase or decrease in size while maintaining a tiling of the sphere; at one limit a tetrahedral tiling is attained, while at another an octahedral tiling appears. In a triangle-square kaleidoscopic tiling, expanding the size of the sides on triangles and decreasing the square's approaches an octahedral tiling of the sphere; the reverse limit reaches a cuboctahedral tiling. This is analogously done with a triangle and a pentagon of different sizes. On one limit, an icosidodecahedral tiling is generated by expanding the pentagons' sides and shrinking the triangles until their sides are of the same length. Continuing past this limit in the same manner eventually generates a dodecahedron tiling.

=== 2-hemisphere tilings ===
In the case of 2-hemisphere tilings, the Platonic, prismatic, and Archimedian spherical tilings that fit on a spherical hemisphere are joined together and rotated about each other (as an infinite family). All the hemisphere tilings arise from either the octahedron, cuboctahedron, icosidodecahedron, or a single $(n,2)$ dihedral hemisphere tile with at least three sides.

=== Lunar and sporadic tilings ===
The four lunar and three sporadic tilings are generated by "gluing together" edge-to-edge four types of composite lunes from sections of the spherical dodecahedron, cuboctahedron, and icosidodecahedron in specific ways.

=== Composed and magic triangle tilings ===
In the last class of non edge-to-edge spherical tilings, the composed tilings, sets of tiles from an icosidodecahedron are combined to form so-called "magic triangles" of side-length exactly equal to $3\pi/5$. These are arranged on a sphere such that in one composed tiling appears one magic triangle, in two other tilings there are two magic triangles formed, and in another two composed tilings there are three magic triangles exhibited.

The spherical tiling featuring a magical triangle, and a complementary tile on the sphere, is also a non edge-to-edge tiling featuring regular polygons; this corresponds to the magic triangle tiling technically in its own class. It is the only non-edge-to-edge spherical tiling that contains a polygon with angle greater than $\pi$ (as the complementary tile, the next-largest angle is hemispheric).

== See also ==
- Spherical geometry
- Toroidal polyhedron
