= 57-cell =

57-cell
Type	Abstract regular 4-polytope
Cells	57 hemi-dodecahedra
Faces	171 {5}
Edges	171
Vertices	57
Vertex figure	hemi-icosahedron
Schläfli type	{5,3,5}
Symmetry group	order 3420; Abstract L_{2}(19)
Dual	self-dual
Properties	Regular

In mathematics, the 57-cell (pentacontaheptachoron) is a self-dual abstract regular 4-polytope (four-dimensional polytope). Its 57 cells are hemi-dodecahedra. It also has 57 vertices, 171 edges and 171 two-dimensional faces.

The symmetry order is 3420, from the product of the number of cells (57) and the symmetry of each cell (60). The symmetry abstract structure is the projective special linear group of the 2-dimensional vector space over the finite field of 19 elements, L_{2}(19).

It has Schläfli type {5,3,5} with 5 hemi-dodecahedral cells around each edge. It was discovered by H. S. M. Coxeter (1982).

== Perkel graph ==
Perkel graphs with 19-fold symmetry

The vertices and edges form the Perkel graph, the unique distance-regular graph with intersection array {6,5,2;1,1,3}, discovered by Manley Perkel (1979).

== See also ==
- 11-cell – abstract regular polytope with hemi-icosahedral cells.
- 120-cell – regular 4-polytope with dodecahedral cells
- Order-5 dodecahedral honeycomb - regular hyperbolic honeycomb with same Schläfli type, {5,3,5}. (The 57-cell can be considered as being derived from it by identification of appropriate elements.)
