= 11-cell =

Abstract regular 4-polytope

11-cell
The 11 hemi-icosahedra with vertices labeled by indices 0..9,t. Faces are colored by the cell it connects to, defined by the small colored boxes.
Type	Abstract regular 4-polytope
Cells	11 hemi-icosahedron
Faces	55 {3}
Edges	55
Vertices	11
Vertex figure	hemi-dodecahedron
Schläfli symbol	$\{\{3,5\}_5,\{5,3\}_5\}$
Symmetry group	order 660; Abstract L_{2}(11)
Dual	self-dual
Properties	Regular

In mathematics, the 11-cell is a self-dual abstract regular 4-polytope (four-dimensional polytope). Its 11 cells are hemi-icosahedral. It has 11 vertices, 55 edges and 55 faces. It has Schläfli type {3,5,3}, with 3 hemi-icosahedra (Schläfli type {3,5}) around each edge.

Its automorphism group has 660 elements. The automorphism group is isomorphic to the projective special linear group of the 2-dimensional vector space over the finite field with 11 elements, L_{2}(11).

It was discovered in 1976 by Branko Grünbaum, who constructed it by pasting hemi-icosahedra together, three at each edge, until the shape closed up. It was independently discovered by H. S. M. Coxeter in 1984, who studied its structure and symmetry in greater depth. It has since been studied and illustrated by Carlo H. Séquin.

Looking only at the vertices and cells, its abstract structure is geometric configuration (11_{6}) and can be defined with a cyclic configuration, with a generator "line" as {0,1,2,4,5,7}_{11}. (Sequential lines increment vertex indices by 1 modulo 11.)

== Related polytopes ==
Orthographic projection of 10-simplex with 11 vertices, 55 edges

The abstract 11-cell contains the same number of vertices and edges as the 10-dimensional 10-simplex, and contains 1/3 of its 165 faces. Thus it can be drawn as a regular figure in 10-space, although then its hemi-icosahedral cells are skew; that is, each cell is not contained within a flat 3-dimensional subspace.

== See also ==
- 5-simplex
- 57-cell
- Icosahedral honeycomb - regular hyperbolic honeycomb with same Schläfli type, {3,5,3}. (The 11-cell can be considered to be derived from it by identification of appropriate elements.)
- Projective linear group#Action on p points - the 11-cell can be used to construct the case where p = 11
