= Projective polyhedron =

Plane tiling corresponding to a polyhedron

In geometry, a (globally) projective polyhedron is a tessellation of the real projective plane. These are projective analogs of spherical polyhedra – tessellations of the sphere – and toroidal polyhedra – tessellations of the toroids.

Projective polyhedra are also referred to as elliptic tessellations or elliptic tilings, referring to the projective plane as (projective) elliptic geometry, by analogy with spherical tiling, a synonym for "spherical polyhedron". However, the term elliptic geometry applies to both spherical and projective geometries, so the term carries some ambiguity for polyhedra.

As cellular decompositions of the projective plane, they have Euler characteristic 1, while spherical polyhedra have Euler characteristic 2. The qualifier "globally" is to contrast with locally projective polyhedra, which are defined in the theory of abstract polyhedra.

Non-overlapping projective polyhedra (density 1) correspond to spherical polyhedra (equivalently, convex polyhedra) with central symmetry. This is elaborated and extended below in relation with spherical polyhedra and relation with traditional polyhedra.

== Examples ==
The hemi-cube is a regular projective polyhedron with 3 square faces, 6 edges, and 4 vertices.

The best-known examples of projective polyhedra are the regular projective polyhedra, the quotients of the centrally symmetric Platonic solids, as well as two infinite classes of even dihedra and hosohedra:

- Hemi-cube, {4,3}/2
- Hemi-octahedron, {3,4}/2
- Hemi-dodecahedron, {5,3}/2
- Hemi-icosahedron, {3,5}/2
- Hemi-dihedron, {2p,2}/2, p>=1
- Hemi-hosohedron, {2,2p}/2, p>=1

These can be obtained by taking the quotient of the associated spherical polyhedron by the antipodal map (identifying opposite points on the sphere).

On the other hand, the tetrahedron does not have central symmetry, so there is no "hemi-tetrahedron". See relation with spherical polyhedra below on how the tetrahedron is treated.

=== Hemipolyhedra ===
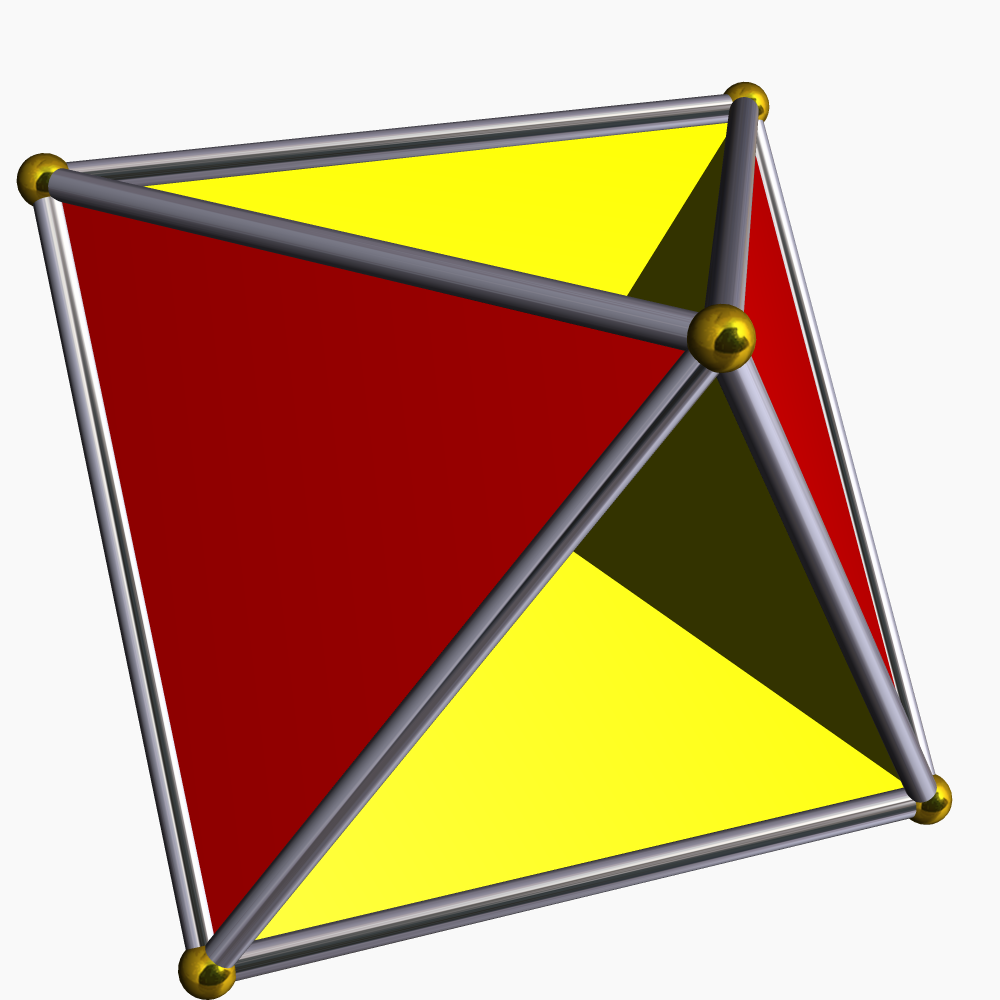
The tetrahemihexahedron is a projective polyhedron, and the only uniform projective polyhedron that immerses in Euclidean 3-space.

Note that the prefix "hemi-" is also used to refer to hemipolyhedra, which are uniform polyhedra having some faces that pass through the center of symmetry. As these do not define spherical polyhedra (because they pass through the center, which does not map to a defined point on the sphere), they do not define projective polyhedra by the quotient map from 3-space (minus the origin) to the projective plane.

Of these uniform hemipolyhedra, only the tetrahemihexahedron is topologically a projective polyhedron, as can be verified by its Euler characteristic and visually obvious connection to the Roman surface. It is 2-covered by the cuboctahedron, and can be realized as the quotient of the spherical cuboctahedron by the antipodal map. It is the only uniform (traditional) polyhedron that is projective – that is, the only uniform projective polyhedron that immerses in Euclidean three-space as a uniform traditional polyhedron.

== Relation with spherical polyhedra ==
There is a 2-to-1 covering map $S^2 \to \mathbf{RP}^2$ of the sphere to the projective plane, and under this map, projective polyhedra correspond to spherical polyhedra with central symmetry – the 2-fold cover of a projective polyhedron is a centrally symmetric spherical polyhedron. Further, because a covering map is a local homeomorphism (in this case a local isometry), both the spherical and the corresponding projective polyhedra have the same abstract vertex figure.

For example, the 2-fold cover of the (projective) hemi-cube is the (spherical) cube. The hemi-cube has 4 vertices, 3 faces, and 6 edges, each of which is covered by 2 copies in the sphere, and accordingly the cube has 8 vertices, 6 faces, and 12 edges, while both these polyhedra have a 4.4.4 vertex figure (3 squares meeting at a vertex).

Further, the symmetry group (of isometries) of a projective polyhedron and covering spherical polyhedron are related: the symmetries of the projective polyhedron are naturally identified with the rotation symmetries of the spherical polyhedron, while the full symmetry group of the spherical polyhedron is the product of its rotation group (the symmetry group of the projective polyhedron) and the cyclic group of order 2, {±I}. See symmetry group below for elaboration and other dimensions.

Spherical polyhedra without central symmetry do not define a projective polyhedron, as the images of vertices, edges, and faces will overlap. In the language of tilings, the image in the projective plane is a degree 2 tiling, meaning that it covers the projective plane twice – rather than 2 faces in the sphere corresponding to 1 face in the projective plane, covering it twice, each face in the sphere corresponds to a single face in the projective plane, accordingly covering it twice.

The correspondence between projective polyhedra and centrally symmetric spherical polyhedra can be extended to a Galois connection including all spherical polyhedra (not necessarily centrally symmetric) if the classes are extended to include degree 2 tilings of the projective plane, whose covers are not polyhedra but rather the polyhedral compound of a non-centrally symmetric polyhedron, together with its central inverse (a compound of 2 polyhedra). This geometrizes the Galois connection at the level of finite subgroups of O(3) and PO(3), under which the adjunction is "union with central inverse". For example, the tetrahedron is not centrally symmetric, and has 4 vertices, 6 edges, and 4 faces, and vertex figure 3.3.3 (3 triangles meeting at each vertex). Its image in the projective plane has 4 vertices, 6 edges (which intersect), and 4 faces (which overlap), covering the projective plane twice. The cover of this is the stellated octahedron – equivalently, the compound of two tetrahedra – which has 8 vertices, 12 edges, and 8 faces, and vertex figure 3.3.3.

== Generalizations ==
In the context of abstract polytopes, one instead refers to "locally projective polytopes" – see Abstract polytope: Local topology. For example, the 11-cell is a "locally projective polytope", but is not a globally projective polyhedron, nor indeed tessellates any manifold, as it is not locally Euclidean, but rather locally projective, as the name indicates.

Projective polytopes can be defined in higher dimension as tessellations of projective space in one less dimension. Defining k-dimensional projective polytopes in n-dimensional projective space is somewhat trickier, because the usual definition of polytopes in Euclidean space requires taking convex combinations of points, which is not a projective concept, and is infrequently addressed in the literature, but has been defined, such as in (Vives & Mayo 1991).

== Symmetry group ==
The symmetry group of a projective polytope is a finite (hence discrete) (Note: Since PO is compact, finite and discrete sets are identical – infinite sets have an accumulation point.) subgroup of the projective orthogonal group, PO, and conversely every finite subgroup of PO is the symmetry group of a projective polytope by taking the polytope given by images of a fundamental domain for the group.

The relevant dimensions are as follows: n-dimensional real projective space is the projectivization of (n+1)-dimensional Euclidean space, $\mathbf{RP}^n = \mathbf{P}(\mathbf{R}^{n+1}),$ so the projective orthogonal group of an n-dimensional projective space is denoted

PO(n+1) = P(O(n+1)) = O(n+1)/{±I}.

If n=2k is even (so n+1 = 2k+1 is odd), then O(2k+1) = SO(2k+1)×{±I} decomposes as a product, and thus $PO(2k+1) = PSO(2k+1) \cong SO(2k+1)$ (Note: The isomorphism/equality distinction in this equation is because the context is the 2-to-1 quotient map $O \to PO$ – PSO(2k+1) and PO(2k+1) are equal subsets of the target (namely, the whole space), hence the equality, while the induced map $SO \to PSO$ is an isomorphism but the two groups are subsets of different spaces, hence the isomorphism rather than an equality. See (Conway & Smith 2003, p. 34) for an example of this distinction being made.) so the group of projective isometries can be identified with the group of rotational isometries.

Thus in particular the symmetry group of a projective polyhedron is the rotational symmetry group of the covering spherical polyhedron; the full symmetry group of the spherical polyhedron is then just the direct product with reflection through the origin, which is the kernel on passage to projective space. The projective plane is non-orientable, and thus there is no distinct notion of "orientation-preserving isometries of a projective polyhedron", which is reflected in the equality PSO(3) = PO(3).

If n=2k + 1 is odd, then O(n+1) = O(2k+2) does not decompose as a product, and thus the symmetry group of the projective polytope is not simply the rotational symmetries of the spherical polytope, but rather a 2-to-1 quotient of the full symmetry group of the corresponding spherical polytope (the spherical group is a central extension of the projective group). Further, in odd projective dimension (even vector dimension) $PSO(2k) \neq PO(2k)$ and is instead a proper (index 2) subgroup, so there is a distinct notion of orientation-preserving isometries.

For example, in n = 1 (polygons), the symmetries of a 2r-gon is the dihedral group Dih_{2r} (of order 4r), with rotational group the cyclic group C_{2r}, these being subgroups of O(2) and SO(2), respectively. The projectivization of a 2r-gon (in the circle) is an r-gon (in the projective line), and accordingly the quotient groups, subgroups of PO(2) and PSO(2) are Dih_{r} and C_{r}. Note that the same commutative square of subgroups occurs for the square of Spin group and Pin group – Spin(2), Pin_{+}(2), SO(2), O(2) – here going up to a 2-fold cover, rather than down to a 2-fold quotient.

Lastly, by the lattice theorem there is a Galois connection between subgroups of O(n) and subgroups of PO(n), in particular of finite subgroups. Under this connection, symmetry groups of centrally symmetric polytopes correspond to symmetry groups of the corresponding projective polytope, while symmetry groups of spherical polytopes without central symmetry correspond to symmetry groups of degree 2 projective polytopes (tilings that cover projective space twice), whose cover (corresponding to the adjunction of the connection) is a compound of two polytopes – the original polytope and its central inverse.

These symmetry groups should be compared and contrasted with binary polyhedral groups – just as Pin_{±}(n) → O(n) is a 2-to-1 cover, and hence there is a Galois connection between binary polyhedral groups and polyhedral groups, O(n) → PO(n) is a 2-to-1-cover, and hence has an analogous Galois connection between subgroups. However, while discrete subgroups of O(n) and PO(n) correspond to symmetry groups of spherical and projective polytopes, corresponding geometrically to the covering map $S^n \to \mathbf{RP}^n,$ there is no covering space of $S^n$ (for $n \geq 2$) as the sphere is simply connected, and thus there is no corresponding "binary polytope" for which subgroups of Pin are symmetry groups.

== See also ==
- Spherical polyhedron
- Toroidal polyhedron
