= Abstract polytope =

Poset representing certain properties of a polytope

A square pyramid and the Hasse diagram of the associated abstract polytope.

In mathematics, an abstract polytope is an algebraic partially ordered set which captures certain combinatorial properties of a traditional polytope without specifying purely geometric properties such as the position of vertices.

A geometric polytope is said to be a realization of an abstract polytope in some real n-dimensional space, typically Euclidean. This abstract definition allows more general combinatorial structures than traditional definitions of a polytope, thus allowing new objects that have no counterpart in traditional theory.

== Principles ==
=== Traditional versus abstract polytopes ===
Isomorphic quadrilaterals.

In Euclidean geometry, two shapes that are not similar can nonetheless share a common structure. For example, a square and a trapezoid both comprise an alternating chain of four vertices and four sides, which makes them quadrilaterals. They are said to be isomorphic or “structure preserving”.

This common structure may be represented in an underlying abstract polytope, a purely algebraic partially ordered set which captures the pattern of connections (or incidences) between the various structural elements. The measurable properties of traditional polytopes such as angles, edge-lengths, skewness, straightness and convexity have no meaning for an abstract polytope.

What is true for traditional polytopes (also called classical or geometric polytopes) may not be so for abstract ones, and vice versa. For example, a traditional polytope is regular if all its facets and vertex figures are regular, but this is not necessarily so for an abstract polytope.

==== Realizations ====
A traditional polytope is said to be a realization of the associated abstract polytope. A realization is a mapping or injection of the abstract object into a real space, typically Euclidean, to construct a traditional polytope as a real geometric figure.

The six quadrilaterals shown are all distinct realizations of the abstract quadrilateral, each with different geometric properties. Some of them do not conform to traditional definitions of a quadrilateral and are said to be unfaithful realizations. A conventional polytope is a faithful realization.

=== Faces, ranks and ordering ===
In an abstract polytope, each structural element (vertex, edge, cell, etc.) is associated with a corresponding member of the set. The term face is used to refer to any such element e.g. a vertex (0-face), edge (1-face) or a general k-face, and not just a polygonal 2-face.

The faces are ranked according to their associated real dimension: vertices have rank 0, edges rank 1 and so on.

Incident faces of different ranks, for example, a vertex F of an edge G, are ordered by the relation F < G. F is said to be a subface of G.

Two faces F and G are said to be incident if either F = G or F < G or G < F. This usage of incidence also occurs in finite geometry, although it differs from traditional geometry and some other areas of mathematics. It is understood in terms of the nodes and vertices in the graph of the Hasse diagram of the polytope, not the geometric drawing of the polytope. For example, in the square ABCD, edges AB and BC are not abstractly incident as can be seen in the Hasse diagram above (although they are both incident, in the geometric sense, with vertex B in the geometric drawing).

A polytope is then defined as a set of faces P with an order relation <. Formally, P (with <) will be a (strict) partially ordered set, or poset.

=== Least and greatest faces ===
Just as the number zero is necessary in mathematics, so also every set has the empty set ∅ as a subset. In an abstract polytope ∅ is by convention included as a face. It is the least or null face and is a subface of all the others, because the empty set is a subset of all other sets. Since the least face is one level below the vertices or 0-faces, its rank is −1 and it may be denoted as F_{−1}. Thus, F_{−1} ≡ ∅ and the abstract polytope also contains the empty set as an element. It is usually not realized, though the lack of its realization could be interpreted as it being realized as the set containing no points, the empty set.

There is also a single face of which all the others are subfaces. This is called the greatest face. In an n-dimensional polytope, the greatest face has rank = n and may be denoted as F_{n}. It is sometimes realized as the interior of the geometric figure.

These least and greatest faces are sometimes called improper faces, with all others being proper faces.

=== A simple example ===
The faces of the abstract quadrilateral or square are shown in the table below:

Face type	Rank (k)	Count	k-faces
Least	−1	1	F_{−1}
Vertex	0	4	a, b, c, d
Edge	1	4	W, X, Y, Z
Greatest	2	1	G

The relation < comprises a set of pairs.

Order relations are transitive, i.e. F < G and G < H implies F < H. Therefore, to specify the hierarchy of faces, it is not necessary to give every case of F < H, but only the pairs where one is the successor of the other, i.e. where F < H and no G satisfies F < G < H.

The edges W, X, Y and Z are sometimes written as ab, ad, bc, and cd respectively, but such notation is not always appropriate.

All four edges are structurally similar and the same is true of the vertices. The figure therefore has the symmetries of a square and is usually referred to as the square.

=== The Hasse diagram ===
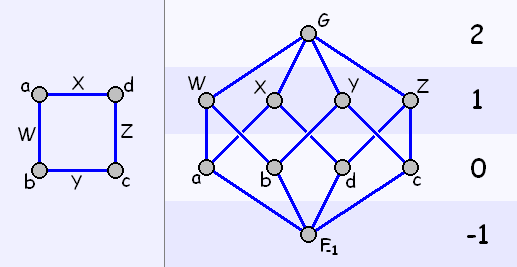
The graph (left) and Hasse diagram of a quadrilateral, showing ranks (right)

Smaller posets, and polytopes in particular, are often best visualized in a Hasse diagram, as shown. By convention, faces of equal rank are placed on the same vertical level. Each connection between faces F and G indicates an ordering relation < such that F < G where F is below G in the diagram.

The Hasse diagram defines the unique poset and therefore fully captures the structure of the polytope. Isomorphic polytopes give rise to isomorphic Hasse diagrams, and vice versa. The same is not generally true for the graph representation of polytopes.

=== Rank ===
The rank of a face F is defined as m − 2, where m is the maximum number of faces in any chain (F_{−1}, F_{0}, …, F) satisfying F_{−1} < F_{0} < … < F. Note that F_{−1} is always the least face.

The rank of an abstract polytope P is the maximum rank of any face. It is always the rank of the greatest face.

The rank of a face or polytope usually corresponds to the dimension of its counterpart in traditional theory.

For some ranks, their face-types are named in the following table.

Rank	Face term
−1	Least
0	Vertex
1	Edge
2	Traditionally face means a rank-2 face or 2-face. In abstract theory the term it denotes a face of any rank.
3	Cell
⋯	⋯
n − 2	Subfacet or ridge
n − 1	Facet
n	Greatest

=== Flags ===
In geometry, a flag is a maximal chain of faces, i.e. a (totally) ordered set Ψ of faces, each a subface of the next (if any), and such that Ψ is not a subset of any larger chain. Given any two distinct faces F and G in a flag, either F < G or F > G.

For example, {∅, a, ab, abc} is a flag in the triangle abc.

For a given polytope, all flags contain the same number of faces. Other posets do not, in general, satisfy this requirement.

=== Sections ===
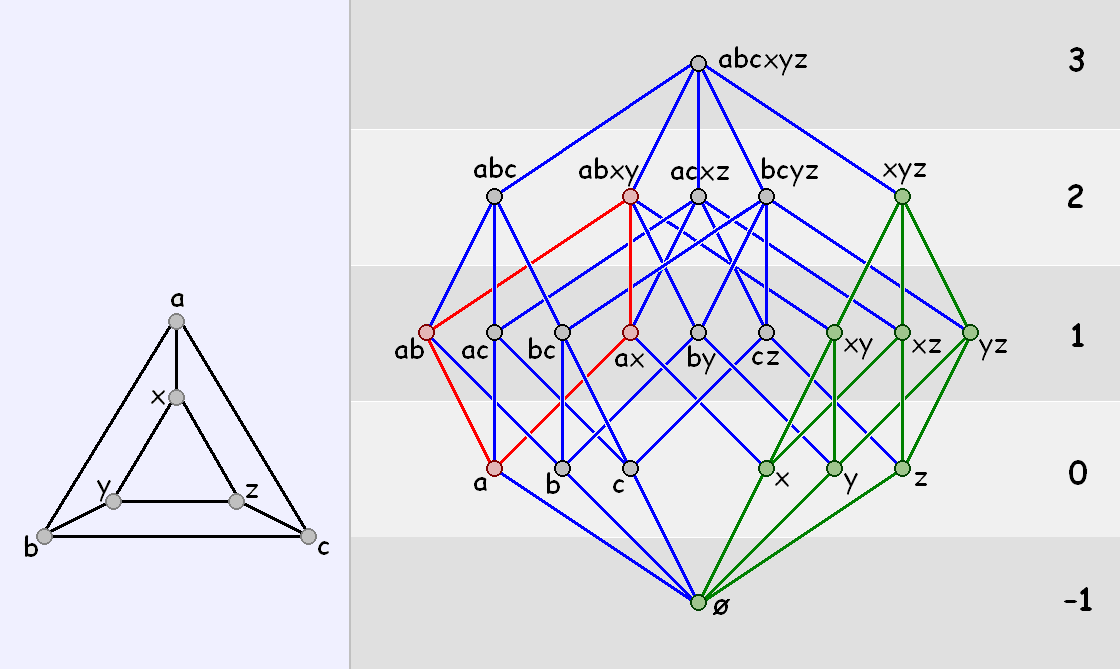
The graph (left) and Hasse Diagram of a triangular prism, showing a 1-section (red), and a 2-section (green).

Any subset P’ of a poset P is a poset (with the same relation <, restricted to P’).

In an abstract polytope, given any two faces F and H of P with F ≤ H, the set {G | F ≤ G ≤ H} is called a section of P, and denoted H/F. (In order theory, a section is called a closed interval of the poset and denoted [F, H].)

For example, in the prism abcxyz (see diagram) the section xyz/∅ (highlighted green) is the triangle

{∅, x, y, z, xy, xz, yz, xyz}.

A k-section is a section of rank k.

P is thus a section of itself.

This concept of section does not have the same meaning as in traditional geometry.

==== Facets ====
The facet for a given k-face F is the (k − 1)-section F/∅.

For example, in the triangle abc, the facet at ab is ab/∅ = {∅, a, b, ab}, which is a line segment.

The distinction between F and F/∅ is not usually significant and the two are often treated as identical.

==== Vertex figures ====
The vertex figure at a given vertex V is the (n − 1)-section F_{n}/V, where F_{n} is the greatest face.

For example, in the triangle abc, the vertex figure at b is abc/b = {b, ab, bc, abc}, which is a line segment. The vertex figures of a cube are triangles.

==== Connectedness ====
A poset P is connected if P has rank ≤ 1, or, given any two proper faces F_{1} and F_{k}, there is a sequence of proper faces

F_{1}, F_{2}, …,F_{k}

such that each F_{i}, i < k, is incident with its successor.

The above condition ensures that a pair of disjoint triangles abc and xyz is not a polytope.

A poset P is strongly connected if every section of P (including P itself) is connected.

With this additional requirement, two pyramids that share just a vertex are also excluded. However, two square pyramids can, for example, be glued at their square faces, giving an octahedron, but the square is not a face of the octahedron.

== Formal definition ==
An abstract polytope is a partially ordered set, whose elements we call faces, satisfying these axioms:

1. It has exactly one least face and exactly one greatest face.
2. All flags contain the same number of faces.
3. It is strongly connected.
4. If the ranks of two faces a > b differ by exactly 2, then there are exactly 2 faces that lie strictly between a and b.

An n-polytope is a polytope of rank n. The abstract polytope associated with a real convex polytope is also referred to as its face lattice.

== The simplest polytopes ==
=== Ranks −1 and 0 ===
There is just one poset for rank −1 and 0. These are, respectively, the null face and the point. These are not always considered to be valid abstract polytopes.

=== Rank 1: the line segment ===
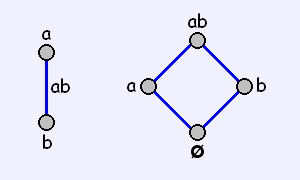
The graph (left) and Hasse Diagram of a line segment

There is only one polytope of rank 1, which is the line segment. It has a least face, just two 0-faces and a greatest face, for example {∅, a, b, ab}. It follows that the vertices a and b have rank 0, and that the greatest face ab, and therefore the poset, both have rank 1.

=== Rank 2: polygons ===
For each p, 3 ≤ p < ∞, we have (the abstract equivalent of) the traditional polygon with p vertices and p edges, or a p-gon. For p = 3, 4, 5, ... we have the triangle, square, pentagon, etc.

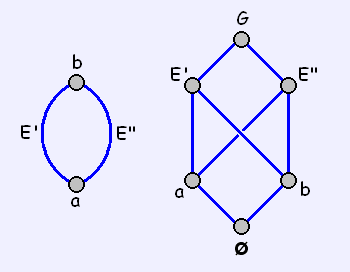
The graph (left) and Hasse Diagram of a digon

For p = 2, we have the digon, and p = ∞ we get the apeirogon.

A digon is a polygon with just 2 edges. Unlike any other polygon, both edges have the same two vertices. For this reason, it is degenerate in the Euclidean plane.

Faces are sometimes described using vertex notation, e.g. {∅, a, b, c, ab, ac, bc, abc} for the triangle abc. This method has the advantage of implying the ordering relation.

With the digon this vertex notation cannot be used. It is necessary to give the faces individual symbols and specify the subface pairs F < G.

Thus, a digon is defined as a set {∅, a, b, E’, E”, G} with the ordering relation given by

∅ < a, b and a, b < E’, E” and E’, E” < G

where E’ and E” are the two edges, and G the greatest face.

This need to identify each element of the polytope with a unique symbol applies to many other abstract polytopes and is therefore common practice.

A polytope can only be fully described using vertex notation if every face is incident with a unique set of vertices. A polytope having this property is said to be atomistic.

== Examples of higher rank ==
The set of k-faces (−1 ≤ k ≤ n) of a traditional n-polytope form an abstract n-polytope.

The concept of an abstract polytope is more general and also includes:

- Apeirotopes or infinite polytopes, which include tessellations (tilings)
- Proper decompositions of unbounded manifolds such as the torus or real projective plane.
- Many other objects, such as the 11-cell and the 57-cell, that cannot be faithfully realized in Euclidean space without being skew.

=== Hosohedra and hosotopes ===
A hexagonal hosohedron, realized as a spherical polyhedron.

The digon is generalized by the hosohedron and higher dimensional hosotopes, which can all be realized as spherical polyhedra – they tessellate the sphere.

=== Projective polytopes ===
The Hemicube may be derived from a cube by identifying opposite vertices, edges, and faces. It has 4 vertices, 6 edges, and 3 faces.

Four examples of non-traditional abstract polyhedra are the Hemicube (shown), Hemi-octahedron, Hemi-dodecahedron, and the Hemi-icosahedron. These are the projective counterparts of the Platonic solids, and can be realized as (globally) projective polyhedra – they tessellate the real projective plane.

The hemicube is another example of where vertex notation cannot be used to define a polytope - all the 2-faces and the 3-face have the same vertex set.

== Duality ==
Every geometric polytope has a dual twin. Abstractly, the dual is the same polytope but with the ranking reversed in order: the Hasse diagram differs only in its annotations. In an n-polytope, each of the original k-faces maps to an (n − k − 1)-face in the dual. Thus, for example, the n-face maps to the (−1)-face. The dual of a dual is (isomorphic to) the original.

A polytope is self-dual if it is the same as, i.e. isomorphic to, its dual. Hence, the Hasse diagram of a self-dual polytope must be symmetrical about the horizontal axis half-way between the top and bottom. The square pyramid in the example above is self-dual.

The vertex figure at a vertex V is the dual of the facet to which V maps in the dual polytope.

== Abstract regular polytopes ==
Formally, an abstract polytope is defined to be regular if its automorphism group acts transitively on the set of its flags. In particular, any two k-faces F, G of an n-polytope are the same in the sense that there is an automorphism which maps F to G. When an abstract polytope is regular, its automorphism group is isomorphic to a quotient of a Coxeter group.

All polytopes of rank ≤ 2 are regular. The most famous regular polyhedra are the five Platonic solids. The hemicube (shown) is also regular.

Informally, for each rank k, this means that there is no way to distinguish any k-face from any other - the faces must be identical, and must have identical neighbors, and so forth. For example, a cube is regular because all the faces are squares, each square's vertices are attached to three squares, and each of these squares is attached to identical arrangements of other faces, edges and vertices, and so on.

This condition alone is sufficient to ensure that any regular abstract polytope has isomorphic regular (n−1)-faces and isomorphic regular vertex figures.

This is a weaker condition than regularity for traditional polytopes, in that it refers to the (combinatorial) automorphism group, not the (geometric) symmetry group. For example, any abstract polygon is regular, since angles, edge-lengths, edge curvature, skewness etc. do not exist for abstract polytopes.

There are several other weaker concepts, some not yet fully standardized, such as semi-regular, quasi-regular, uniform, chiral, and Archimedean that apply to polytopes that have some, but not all of their faces equivalent in each rank.

== Realization ==
A set of points V in a Euclidean space equipped with a surjection from the vertex set of an abstract polytope P such that automorphisms of P induce isometric permutations of V is called a realization of an abstract polytope. Two realizations are called congruent if the natural bijection between their sets of vertices is induced by an isometry of their ambient Euclidean spaces.

If an abstract n-polytope is realized in n-dimensional space, such that the geometrical arrangement does not break any rules for traditional polytopes (such as curved faces, or ridges of zero size), then the realization is said to be faithful. In general, only a restricted set of abstract polytopes of rank n may be realized faithfully in any given n-space. The characterization of this effect is an outstanding problem.

For a regular abstract polytope, if the combinatorial automorphisms of the abstract polytope are realized by geometric symmetries then the geometric figure will be a regular polytope.

=== Moduli space ===
The group G of symmetries of a realization V of an abstract polytope P is generated by two reflections, the product of which translates each vertex of P to the next. The product of the two reflections can be decomposed as a product of a non-zero translation, finitely many rotations, and possibly trivial reflection.

Generally, the moduli space of realizations of an abstract polytope is a convex cone of infinite dimension. The realization cone of the abstract polytope has uncountably infinite algebraic dimension and cannot be closed in the Euclidean topology.

== The amalgamation problem and universal polytopes ==
An important question in the theory of abstract polytopes is the amalgamation problem. This is a series of questions such as

For given abstract polytopes K and L, are there any polytopes P whose facets are K and whose vertex figures are L ?
If so, are they all finite ?
What finite ones are there ?

For example, if K is the square, and L is the triangle, the answers to these questions are

Yes, there are polytopes P with square faces, joined three per vertex (that is, there are polytopes of type {4,3}).
Yes, they are all finite, specifically,
There is the cube, with six square faces, twelve edges and eight vertices, and the hemi-cube, with three faces, six edges and four vertices.

It is known that if the answer to the first question is 'Yes' for some regular K and L, then there is a unique polytope whose facets are K and whose vertex figures are L, called the universal polytope with these facets and vertex figures, which covers all other such polytopes. That is, suppose P is the universal polytope with facets K and vertex figures L. Then any other polytope Q with these facets and vertex figures can be written Q=P/N, where

- N is a subgroup of the automorphism group of P, and
- P/N is the collection of orbits of elements of P under the action of N, with the partial order induced by that of P.

Q=P/N is called a quotient of P, and we say P covers Q.

Given this fact, the search for polytopes with particular facets and vertex figures usually goes as follows:

1. Attempt to find the applicable universal polytope
2. Attempt to classify its quotients.

These two problems are, in general, very difficult.

Returning to the example above, if K is the square, and L is the triangle, the universal polytope {K,L} is the cube (also written {4,3}). The hemicube is the quotient {4,3}/N, where N is a group of symmetries (automorphisms) of the cube with just two elements - the identity, and the symmetry that maps each corner (or edge or face) to its opposite.

If L is, instead, also a square, the universal polytope {K,L} (that is, {4,4}) is the tessellation of the Euclidean plane by squares. This tessellation has infinitely many quotients with square faces, four per vertex, some regular and some not. Except for the universal polytope itself, they all correspond to various ways to tessellate either a torus or an infinitely long cylinder with squares.

=== The 11-cell and the 57-cell ===
The 11-cell, discovered independently by H. S. M. Coxeter and Branko Grünbaum, is an abstract 4-polytope. Its facets are hemi-icosahedra. Since its facets are, topologically, projective planes instead of spheres, the 11-cell is not a tessellation of any manifold in the usual sense. Instead, the 11-cell is a locally projective polytope. It is self-dual and universal: it is the only polytope with hemi-icosahedral facets and hemi-dodecahedral vertex figures.

The 57-cell is also self-dual, with hemi-dodecahedral facets. It was discovered by H. S. M. Coxeter shortly after the discovery of the 11-cell. Like the 11-cell, it is also universal, being the only polytope with hemi-dodecahedral facets and hemi-icosahedral vertex figures. On the other hand, there are many other polytopes with hemi-dodecahedral facets and Schläfli type {5,3,5}. The universal polytope with hemi-dodecahedral facets and icosahedral (not hemi-icosahedral) vertex figures is finite, but very large, with 10006920 facets and half as many vertices.

=== Local topology ===
The amalgamation problem has, historically, been pursued according to local topology. That is, rather than restricting K and L to be particular polytopes, they are allowed to be any polytope with a given topology, that is, any polytope tessellating a given manifold. If K and L are spherical (that is, tessellations of a topological sphere), then P is called locally spherical and corresponds itself to a tessellation of some manifold. For example, if K and L are both squares (and so are topologically the same as circles), P will be a tessellation of the plane, torus or Klein bottle by squares. A tessellation of an n-dimensional manifold is actually a rank-(n + 1) polytope. This is in keeping with the common intuition that the Platonic solids are three dimensional, even though they can be regarded as tessellations of the two-dimensional surface of a ball.

In general, an abstract polytope is called locally X if its facets and vertex figures are, topologically, either spheres or X, but not both spheres. The 11-cell and 57-cell are examples of rank-4 (that is, four-dimensional) locally projective polytopes, since their facets and vertex figures are tessellations of real projective planes. There is a weakness in this terminology however. It does not allow an easy way to describe a polytope whose facets are tori and whose vertex figures are projective planes, for example. Worse still if different facets have different topologies, or no well-defined topology at all. However, much progress has been made on the complete classification of the locally toroidal regular polytopes

== Exchange maps ==
Let Ψ be a flag of an abstract n-polytope, and let −1 < i < n. From the definition of an abstract polytope, it can be proven that there is a unique flag differing from Ψ by a rank-i element, and the same otherwise. If we call this flag Ψ^{(i)}, then this defines a collection of maps on the polytopes flags, say φ_{i}. These maps are called exchange maps, since they swap pairs of flags: (Ψφ_{i})φ_{i} = Ψ always. Some other properties of the exchange maps:

- φ^{2}_{i} is the identity map
- The φ_{i} generate a group. (The action of this group on the flags of the polytope is an example of what is called the flag action of the group on the polytope)
- φ_{i} φ_{j} = φ_{j} φ_{i} if |i − j| > 1
- α φ_{i} = φ_{i} α if α is an automorphism of the polytope
- If the polytope is regular, the group generated by the φ_{i} is isomorphic to the automorphism group, otherwise, it is strictly larger.

The exchange maps and the flag action in particular can be used to prove that any abstract polytope is a quotient of some regular polytope.

== Incidence matrices ==
A polytope can also be represented by tabulating its incidences.

The following incidence matrix is that of a triangle:

	∅	a	b	c	ab	bc	ca	abc
∅	1	1	1	1	1	1	1	1
a	1	1	0	0	1	0	1	1
b	1	0	1	0	1	1	0	1
c	1	0	0	1	0	1	1	1
ab	1	1	1	0	1	0	0	1
bc	1	0	1	1	0	1	0	1
ca	1	1	0	1	0	0	1	1
abc	1	1	1	1	1	1	1	1

The table shows a 1 wherever a face is a subface of another, or vice versa (so the table is symmetric about the diagonal)- so in fact, the table has redundant information; it would suffice to show only a 1 when the row face ≤ the column face.

Since both the body and the empty set are incident with all other elements, the first row and column as well as the last row and column are trivial and can conveniently be omitted.

=== Square pyramid ===
A square pyramid and the associated abstract polytope.

Further information is gained by counting each occurrence. This numerative usage enables a symmetry grouping, as in the Hasse Diagram of the square pyramid: If vertices B, C, D, and E are considered symmetrically equivalent within the abstract polytope, then edges f, g, h, and j will be grouped together, and also edges k, l, m, and n, And finally also the triangles P, Q, R, and S. Thus the corresponding incidence matrix of this abstract polytope may be shown as:

	A	B, C, D, E	f, g, h, j	k, l, m, n	P, Q, R, S	T
A	1	*	4	0	4	0
B, C, D, E	*	4	1	2	2	1
f, g, h, j	1	1	4	*	2	0
k, l, m, n	0	2	*	4	1	1
P, Q, R, S	1	2	2	1	4	*
T	0	4	0	4	*	1

In this accumulated incidence matrix representation the diagonal entries represent the total counts of either element type.

Elements of different type of the same rank clearly are never incident so the value will always be 0; however, to help distinguish such relationships, an asterisk (*) is used instead of 0.

The sub-diagonal entries of each row represent the incidence counts of the relevant sub-elements, while the super-diagonal entries represent the respective element counts of the vertex-, edge- or whatever figure.

Already this simple square pyramid shows that the symmetry-accumulated incidence matrices are no longer symmetrical. But there is still a simple entity-relation (beside the generalised Euler formulae for the diagonal, respectively the sub-diagonal entities of each row, respectively the super-diagonal elements of each row - those at least whenever no holes or stars etc. are considered), as for any such incidence matrix I = (I_{ij})_{ij} holds:

I_{ii} ⋅ I_{ij} = I_{ji} ⋅ I_{jj} for i < j.

== History ==
In the 1960s Branko Grünbaum issued a call to the geometric community to consider generalizations of the concept of regular polytopes that he called polystromata. He developed a theory of polystromata, showing examples of new objects including the 11-cell.

The 11-cell is a self-dual 4-polytope whose facets are not icosahedra, but are "hemi-icosahedra" — that is, they are the shape one gets if one considers opposite faces of the icosahedra to be actually the same face (Grünbaum, 1977). A few years after Grünbaum's discovery of the 11-cell, H.S.M. Coxeter discovered a similar polytope, the 57-cell (Coxeter 1982, 1984), and then independently rediscovered the 11-cell.

With the earlier work by Branko Grünbaum, H. S. M. Coxeter and Jacques Tits having laid the groundwork, the basic theory of the combinatorial structures now known as abstract polytopes was first described by Egon Schulte in his 1980 PhD dissertation. In it he defined "regular incidence complexes" and "regular incidence polytopes". Subsequently, he and Peter McMullen developed the basics of the theory in a series of research articles that were later collected into a book. Numerous other researchers have since made their own contributions, and the early pioneers (including Grünbaum) have also accepted Schulte's definition as the "correct" one.

Since then, research in the theory of abstract polytopes has focused mostly on regular polytopes, that is, those whose automorphism groups act transitively on the set of flags of the polytope.

== See also ==
- Eulerian poset
- Graded poset
- Regular polytope
