= Hemi-octahedron =

Abstract regular polyhedron with 4 triangular faces

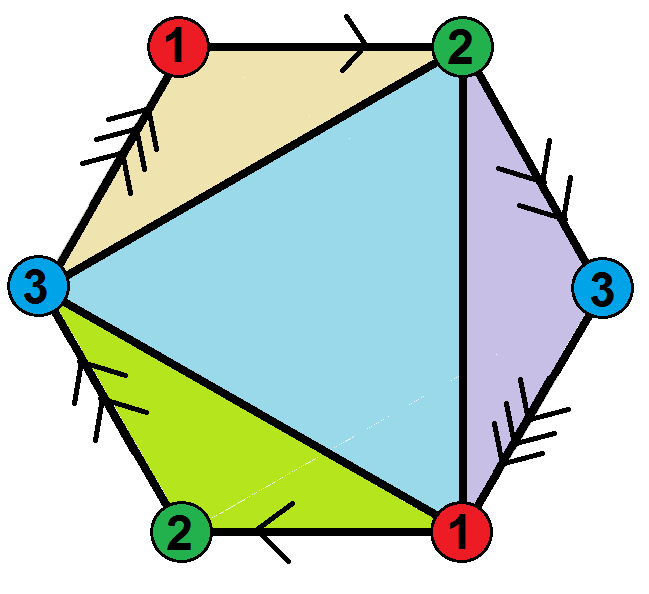
- Type: abstract regular polyhedron globally projective polyhedron
- Faces: 4 triangles
- Edges: 6
- Vertices: 3
- Euler char.: χ = 1
- Vertex configuration: 3.3.3.3
- Schläfli symbol: {3,4}/2 or {3,4}_{3}
- Symmetry group: S_{4}, order 24
- Dual polyhedron: hemicube
- Properties: non-orientable

In geometry, a hemi-octahedron is an abstract regular polyhedron, containing half the faces of a regular octahedron.

It has 4 triangular faces, 6 edges, and 3 vertices. Its dual polyhedron is the hemicube.

It can be realized as a projective polyhedron (a tessellation of the real projective plane by 4 triangles), which can be visualized by constructing the projective plane as a hemisphere where opposite points along the boundary are connected and dividing the hemisphere into four equal parts. It can be seen as a square pyramid without its base.

It can be represented symmetrically as a hexagonal or square Schlegel diagram:

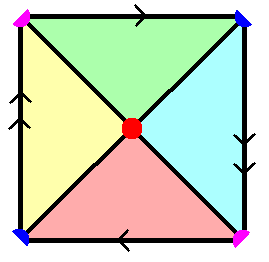

It has an unexpected property that there are two distinct edges between every pair of vertices – any two vertices define a digon.

== See also ==
- Hemi-dodecahedron
- Hemi-icosahedron
- Hemicube (geometry)
