= Hemi-dodecahedron =

Abstract regular polyhedron with 6 pentagonal faces

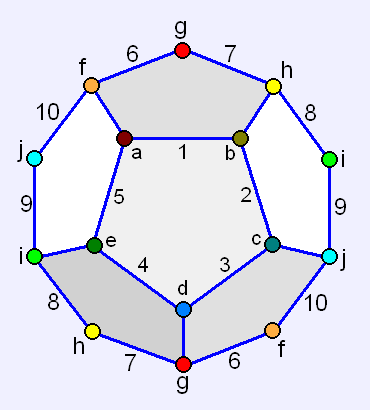
- Decagonal Schlegel diagram
- Type: Abstract regular polyhedron Globally projective polyhedron
- Faces: 6 pentagons
- Edges: 15
- Vertices: 10
- Euler char.: χ = 1
- Vertex configuration: 5.5.5
- Schläfli symbol: {5,3}/2 or {5,3}_{5}
- Symmetry group: A_{5}, order 60
- Dual polyhedron: hemi-icosahedron
- Properties: Non-orientable

In geometry, a hemi-dodecahedron is an abstract, regular polyhedron, containing half the faces of a regular dodecahedron. It can be realized as a projective polyhedron (a tessellation of the real projective plane by 6 pentagons), which can be visualized by constructing the projective plane as a hemisphere where opposite points along the boundary are connected and dividing the hemisphere into three equal parts.

It has 6 pentagonal faces, 15 edges, and 10 vertices.

== Projections ==
It can be projected symmetrically inside of a 10-sided or 12-sided perimeter:

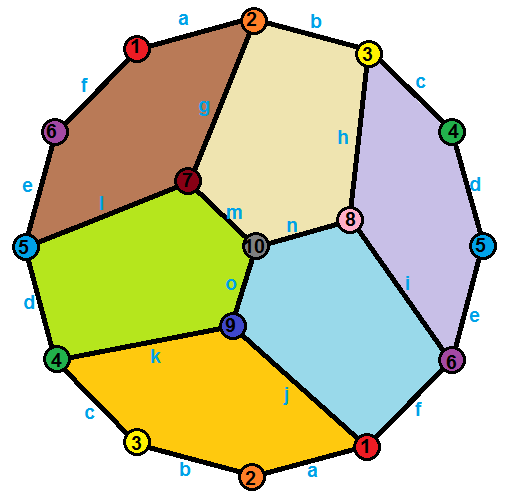

== Petersen graph ==
From the point of view of graph theory this is an embedding of the Petersen graph on a real projective plane. With this embedding, the dual graph is K_{6} (the complete graph with 6 vertices) --- see hemi-icosahedron.

The six faces of the hemi-dodecahedron depicted as colored cycles in the Petersen graph

== See also ==
- 57-cell – an abstract regular 4-polytope constructed from 57 hemi-dodecahedra.
- hemi-icosahedron
- hemi-cube
- hemi-octahedron
