= Flag (geometry) =

Aspect of geometry

Face diagram of a square pyramid showing one of its flags

In (polyhedral) geometry, a flag is a sequence of faces of a polytope, each contained in the next, with exactly one face from each dimension.

More formally, a flag ψ of an n-polytope is a set {F_{-1}, F_{0}, ..., F_{n}} such that F_{i} ≤ F_{i+1} (-1 ≤ i ≤ n – 1) and there is precisely one F_{i} in ψ for each i, (-1 ≤ i ≤ n). Since, however, the minimal face F_{–1} and the maximal face F_{n} must be in every flag, they are often omitted from the list of faces, as a shorthand. These latter two are called improper faces.

For example, a flag of a polyhedron comprises one vertex, one edge incident to that vertex, and one polygonal face incident to both, plus the two improper faces.

A polytope is regular if, and only if, its symmetry group is transitive on its flags. This definition excludes chiral polytopes.

Two flags are j-adjacent if they only differ by a face of rank j. They are adjacent if they are j-adjacent for some value of j. Each flag is j-adjacent to precisely one flag.

== Incidence geometry ==
In the more abstract setting of incidence geometry, which is a set having a symmetric and reflexive relation called incidence defined on its elements, a flag is a set of elements that are mutually incident. This level of abstraction generalizes both the polyhedral concept given above as well as the related flag concept from linear algebra.

A flag is maximal if it is not contained in a larger flag. An incidence geometry (Ω, I) has rank r if Ω can be partitioned into sets Ω_{1}, Ω_{2}, ..., Ω_{r}, such that each maximal flag of the geometry intersects each of these sets in exactly one element. In this case, the elements of set Ω_{j} are called elements of type j.

Consequently, in a geometry of rank r, each maximal flag has exactly r elements.

An incidence geometry of rank 2 is commonly called an incidence structure with elements of type 1 called points and elements of type 2 called blocks (or lines in some situations). More formally,

An incidence structure is a triple D = (V, B, I) where V and B are any two disjoint sets and I is a binary relation between V and B, that is, I ⊆ V × B. The elements of V will be called points, those of B blocks and those of I flags.

== See also ==
- Flag (linear algebra)
