= Hemi-icosahedron =

Abstract regular polyhedron with 10 triangular faces

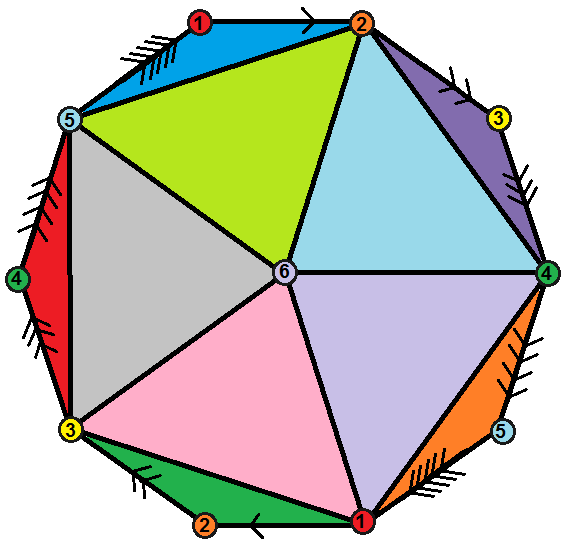
- decagonal Schlegel diagram
- Type: abstract regular polyhedron globally projective polyhedron
- Faces: 10 triangles
- Edges: 15
- Vertices: 6
- Euler char.: χ = 1
- Vertex configuration: 3.3.3.3.3
- Schläfli symbol: {3,5}/2 or {3,5}_{5}
- Symmetry group: A_{5}, order 60
- Dual polyhedron: hemi-dodecahedron
- Properties: non-orientable

In geometry, a hemi-icosahedron is an abstract regular polyhedron, containing half the faces of a regular icosahedron. It can be realized as a projective polyhedron (a tessellation of the real projective plane by 10 triangles), which can be visualized by constructing the projective plane as a hemisphere where opposite points along the boundary are connected and dividing the hemisphere into three equal parts.

== Geometry ==
It has 10 triangular faces, 15 edges, and 6 vertices.

It is also related to the nonconvex uniform polyhedron, the tetrahemihexahedron, which could be topologically identical to the hemi-icosahedron if each of the 3 square faces were divided into two triangles.

== Graphs ==
It can be represented symmetrically on faces, and vertices as Schlegel diagrams:

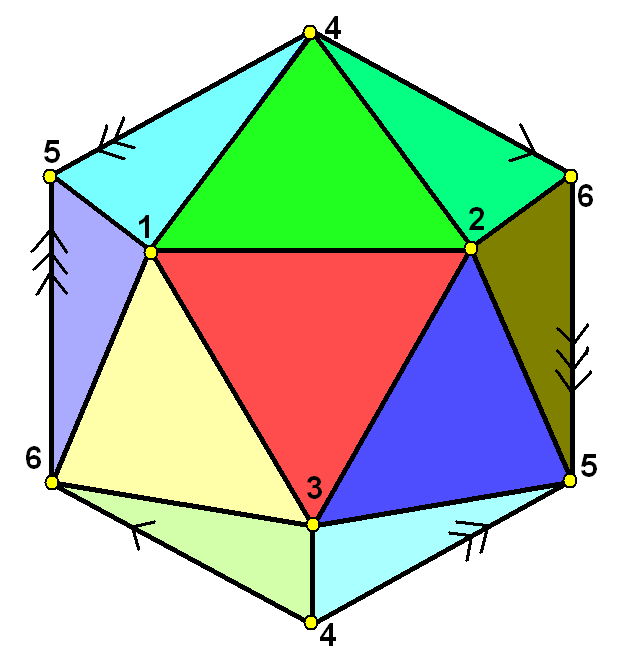
Face-centered

== The complete graph K6 ==
It has the same vertices and edges as the 5-dimensional 5-simplex which has a complete graph of edges, but only contains half of the (20) faces.

From the point of view of graph theory this is an embedding of $K_6$ (the complete graph with 6 vertices) on a real projective plane. With this embedding, the dual graph is the Petersen graph --- see hemi-dodecahedron.

The complete graph K_{6} represents the 6 vertices and 15 edges of the hemi-icosahedron

== See also ==
- 11-cell - an abstract regular 4-polytope constructed from 11 hemi-icosahedra.
- hemi-dodecahedron
- hemi-cube
- hemi-octahedron
