= Shya Chitaley =

Indian American Palaeobotanist (1918–2013)

Shyamala (Dixit) Dinkar Chitaley
- Born: 15 February 1918; Maharashtra, India
- Died: 31 March 2013 (aged 95); Ashland, Massachusetts, United States
- Citizenship: United States of America
- Education: University of Nagpur (BSc; MSc), University of Reading (PhD)
- Spouse(s): Dinkar Vaman Chitaley (Died January, 2000)
- Scientific career
- Fields: Paleobotany
- Workplaces: Institute of Science, Nagpur, Institute of Science, Bombay, Cleveland Museum of Natural History

Shyamala "Shya" Chitaley (15 February 1918 – 31 March 2013) was an Indian American paleobotanist who had a nearly 60-year career of teaching and research in both the United States and India. She was the founder and first curator of the paleobotany department at the Cleveland Museum of Natural History, winner of the 2010 Botanical Society of America Award for Contributions to Paleobotany, and author of approximately 150 publications.

== Early life ==
Chitaley was born Shyamala Dixit in 1918 in Maharashtra, India. Raised mostly by her father (her mother died when she was 9 years old), she also educated at home. As was traditional at the time, she married Dinkar Vaman Chitaley, a corporate lawyer, at a fairly young age. While she faced discouragement and even physical threats about her higher education from some, she continued to pursue her studies with her husband Dinkar's encouragement.

== Career in India ==
Chitaley received a BSc and MSc from the University of Nagpur and a PhD from the University of Reading, having received an International Federation of University Women scholarship in the process. Following completion of her PhD, Chitaley taught at the Institute of Science, Nagpur and The Institute of Science, Bombay, and was named a fellow of the Geological Society of London. She held the chairs in botany at each institution until a mandatory retirement at age 60. Her research in India focused on the flora of the Upper Cretaceous.

== Career in the United States ==
Following her retirement from the Institute of Science, Bombay in 1978, Chitaley and her husband traveled to the United States to visit one of their sons who lived near Cleveland, Ohio. While searching for a teaching job in the United States, Chitaley became an American citizen and sold Avon Products door-to-door.

In 1980, Chitaley was hired by the Cleveland Museum of Natural History as the museum's first paleobotanist. Chitaley built the museum's paleobotany collection from approximately 500 pieces to over 30,000 by acquiring a disused collection from the University of Cincinnati worth millions of dollars. Chitaley's research in Cleveland focused on Lycopodiophyta from the Devonian Period Cleveland Shales. In 1996 she discovered a new Devonian lycopsid, which she named Clevelandodendron ohioensis in honor of Cleveland's 1996 bicentennial. Chitaley also developed a technique of preserving fossilized material in coal balls using wax, which came to be known as the "Chitaley technique".

In 2006, a newly discovered species of conifer from the Permian Period, Prototaxoxylom chitaleyii was named in Chitaley's honor. In 2010 she won the Botanical Society of America award for her lifetime of contributions to paleobotany, which included nearly 150 publications.

== Awards ==
- 2004: Cardinal Award, Ohio Department of Natural Resources
- 2006: Medal for excellence in paleobotanical research and lifetime achievement award, Birbal-Savitri Sahni Foundation
- 2010: Award for Contributions to Paleobotany, The Paleobotanical Section of the Botanical Society of America
- 2011: Distinguished career award, Association of Midwestern Museums
