= Shrikhande graph =

Undirected graph named after S. S. Shrikhande

- The Shrikhande graph
- Named after: S. S. Shrikhande
- Vertices: 16
- Edges: 48
- Radius: 2
- Diameter: 2
- Girth: 3
- Automorphisms: 192
- Chromatic number: 4
- Chromatic index: 6
- Book thickness: 4
- Queue number: 3
- Properties: Strongly regular Hamiltonian; Symmetric; Eulerian; Integral

In the mathematical field of graph theory, the Shrikhande graph is a graph discovered by S. S. Shrikhande in 1959. It is a strongly regular graph with 16 vertices and 48 edges, with each vertex having degree 6. Every pair of nodes has exactly two other neighbors in common, whether or not the pair of nodes is connected.

== Construction ==
The Shrikhande graph can be constructed as a Cayley graph. The vertex set is $\mathbb{Z}_4 \times \mathbb{Z}_4$. Two vertices are adjacent if and only if the difference is in $\{\pm( 1,0),\pm(0,1),\pm (1,1)\}$.

== Properties ==
In the Shrikhande graph, any two distinct vertices I and J have two neighbors in common, which holds true whether or not I is adjacent to J. In other words, it is strongly regular and its parameters are {16, 6, 2, 2}, with $\lambda = \mu = 2$. This equality implies that the graph is associated with a symmetric BIBD. The Shrikhande graph shares these parameters with exactly one other graph, the 4×4 rook's graph, i.e., the line graph L(K_{4,4}) of the complete bipartite graph K_{4,4}. The latter graph is the only line graph L(K_{n,n}) for which the strong regularity parameters do not determine that graph uniquely but are shared with a different graph.

The Shrikhande graph is locally hexagonal; that is, the neighbors of each vertex form a cycle of six vertices. As with any locally cyclic graph, the Shrikhande graph is the 1-skeleton of a Whitney triangulation of some surface; in the case of the Shrikhande graph, this surface is a torus in which each vertex is surrounded by six triangles. Thus, the Shrikhande graph is a toroidal graph. The embedding forms a regular map in the torus, with 32 triangular faces. The skeleton of the dual of this map (as embedded in the torus) is the Dyck graph, a cubic symmetric graph.

The Shrikhande graph is not a distance-transitive graph. It is the smallest distance-regular graph that is not distance-transitive.

The automorphism group of the Shrikhande graph is of order 192. It acts transitively on the vertices, on the edges and on the arcs of the graph. Therefore, the Shrikhande graph is a symmetric graph.

The characteristic polynomial of the Shrikhande graph is $(x-6)(x-2)^6(x+2)^9$. Therefore, the Shrikhande graph is an integral graph: its spectrum consists entirely of integers.

It has book thickness 4 and queue number 3.

The graph is not 1-planar.

== Gallery ==
The Shrikhande graph is a toroidal graph.

The chromatic number of the Shrikhande graph is 4.

The chromatic index of the Shrikhande graph is 6.

The Shrikhande graph drawn symmetrically.

The Shrikhande graph is Hamiltonian.
