= CMNH =

The acronym CMNH may refer to:

- Carnegie Museum of Natural History in Pennsylvania
- Cleveland Museum of Natural History in Ohio
- Children's Miracle Network Hospitals, an international non-profit organization
