= Sharadchandra Shankar Shrikhande =

Indian mathematician (1917–2020)

Sharadchandra S. Shrikhande
- Born: 19 October 1917; Sagar, British India (Now in Madhya Pradesh, India)
- Died: 21 April 2020 (aged 102); Vijayawada, Andhra Pradesh, India
- Citizenship: Indian
- Education: Institute of Science, Nagpur; Nagpur University; University of North Carolina, Chapel Hill
- Known for: Euler's conjecture Shrikhande graph
- Scientific career
- Fields: Combinatorics
- Workplaces: University of Mumbai, University of North Carolina, Chapel Hill, Banaras Hindu University
- Doctoral advisor: Raj Chandra Bose

Sharadchandra Shankar Shrikhande (19 October 1917 – 21 April 2020) was an Indian mathematician with notable achievements in combinatorial mathematics. He was notable for his breakthrough work along with R. C. Bose and E. T. Parker in their disproof of the famous conjecture made by Leonhard Euler dated 1782 that there do not exist two mutually orthogonal latin squares of order 4n + 2 for any n. Shrikhande's specialties were combinatorics and statistical designs. The Shrikhande graph is used in statistical design.

== Life, education and career ==
He was the fifth of ten siblings. His father worked at a flour mill. He completed his B.Sc. from Government Science College, Nagpur and went for further studies at the Indian Statistical Institute. He then briefly worked as a lecturer at the Government Science College, Nagpur.

Shrikhande received a Ph.D. in the year 1950 from the University of North Carolina at Chapel Hill under the supervision of Raj Chandra Bose. Shrikhande taught at various universities in the US and in India. Shrikhande was a professor of mathematics at Banaras Hindu University, Banaras, and the founding head of the department of mathematics, University of Mumbai and the founding director of the Center of Advanced Study in Mathematics, Mumbai until he retired in 1978. He was a fellow of the Indian National Science Academy, the Indian Academy of Sciences and the Institute of Mathematical Statistics, USA.

In 1988, his wife Shakuntala died and he moved to the United States. Shrikhande returned to India in 2009. He turned 100 in October 2017 and died in April 2020 at the age of 102.

His son Mohan Shrikhande is a professor of combinatorial mathematics at Central Michigan University in Mt. Pleasant, Michigan.
