= Chiral polytope =

The flags of Heawood map under its automorphism group form two orbits, colored here in black and yellow.

In the study of abstract polytopes, a chiral polytope is a polytope that is as symmetric as possible without being mirror-symmetric, formalized in terms of the action of the symmetry group of the polytope on its flags.

== Definition ==
The technical definition of a chiral polytope is a polytope that has exactly two orbits of flags under its group of symmetries, such that adjacent flags always lie in different orbits.

If $\Phi$ represents the set of all flags of the polytope $\mathcal{P}$, and $\Gamma(\mathcal{P})$ is the symmetry group, the chirality condition is expressed as:
$$|\Phi / \Gamma(\mathcal{P})| = 2$$

This implies that the polytope is vertex-transitive, edge-transitive, and face-transitive, as each element must be represented by flags in both orbits. However, it cannot be mirror-symmetric, as any reflection would necessarily map a flag to an adjacent flag, thereby collapsing the two orbits into one.

== Geometrically chiral polytopes ==
Geometrically chiral polytopes are exotic structures that cannot be convex. Many geometrically chiral polytopes are skew, meaning their vertices do not all lie in a single hyperplane.

=== In three dimensions ===
In Euclidean 3-space, there are no finite chiral polyhedra. While the snub cube is vertex-transitive and lacks mirror symmetry, it is not a chiral polytope because its flags form more than two orbits. However, there exist three types of infinite chiral skew polyhedra:

- $\{4, 6\}$ (quadrilateral faces, six around each vertex)
- $\{6, 4\}$ (hexagonal faces, four around each vertex)
- $\{6, 6\}$ (hexagonal faces, six around each vertex)

=== In four dimensions ===
In four dimensions, finite geometrically chiral polytopes do exist. A prominent example is Roli's cube, a skew polytope constructed on the skeleton of the 4-cube.

== Combinatorial chirality and maps ==
Combinatorial chirality refers to the properties of an abstract polytope regardless of its geometric realization. Many chiral abstract polytopes are realized as maps on surfaces.

For a map of type $\{p, q\}$ on a surface, the map is chiral if its automorphism group $\text{Aut}(\mathcal{M})$ has two flag orbits. On a torus, chiral maps are often denoted using the notation $\{4, 4\}_{b,c}$ or $\{3, 6\}_{b,c}$. These maps are chiral if and only if $bc(b-c) \neq 0$.

== Symmetry groups ==
The symmetry group $\Gamma(\mathcal{P})$ of a chiral polytope of rank $n$ is generated by elements $\sigma_1, \sigma_2, \dots, \sigma_{n-1}$. In a regular polytope, these would be defined by reflections $\rho_i$ such that $\sigma_i = \rho_{i-1}\rho_i$.

In the chiral case, the generators satisfy:

1. $\sigma_i^{p_i} = 1$
2. $(\sigma_i \sigma_{i+1} \dots \sigma_j)^2 = 1$ for $1 \le i < j \le n-1$

Crucially, there is no automorphism $\phi$ such that $\phi^2 = 1$ that acts as a reflection on the flags, meaning the full Coxeter group is not realized.
