= Regular map =

Regular map may refer to:

- a regular map (algebraic geometry), in algebraic geometry, an everywhere-defined, polynomial function of algebraic varieties
- a regular map (graph theory), a symmetric 2-cell embedding of a graph into a closed surface
