= Evalyn Gates =

American author and scientists

Evalyn I. Gates is an American cosmologist, astrophysicist, author, and a former executive director and CEO of the Cleveland Museum of Natural History.

== Early life and education ==
Gates grew up in Batavia, New York. She received her undergraduate degree from the College of William & Mary and her Ph.D. in theoretical physics from Case Western Reserve University. Gates completed postdoctoral fellowships at Yale University and the University of Chicago and was a member of the theoretical astrophysics research group at Fermi National Accelerator Laboratory.

== Career ==
While at the University of Chicago, Gate's research included investigations into white dwarf stars. From 2010 until 2017, Gates was the executive director and CEO of the Cleveland Museum of Natural History.

== Selected publications ==
- Gates, Evalyn; Terning, John (1991-09-30). "Negative contributions to radiative-correction parameter S from Majorana particles". Physical Review Letters. 67 (14): 1840–1843. Bibcode:1991PhRvL..67.1840G. doi:10.1103/PhysRevLett.67.1840. ISSN 0031-9007. PMID 10044264.
- Gates, Evalyn I.; Gyuk, Geza; Turner, Michael S. (1995-08-20). "The Local Halo Density". The Astrophysical Journal. 449 (2). arXiv:astro-ph/9505039. Bibcode:1995ApJ...449L.123G. doi:10.1086/309652.
- Dodelson, Scott; Gates, Evalyn I.; Turner, Michael S. (1996-10-04). "Cold Dark Matter". Science. 274 (5284): 69–75. arXiv:astro-ph/9603081. Bibcode:1996Sci...274...69D. doi:10.1126/science.274.5284.69. ISSN 0036-8075.
- Abazajian, Kevork N.; et al. (2009-06-01). "The Seventh Data Release of the Sloan Digital Sky Survey". The Astrophysical Journal Supplement Series. 182 (2): 543–558. arXiv:0812.0649. Bibcode:2009ApJS..182..543A. doi:10.1088/0067-0049/182/2/543. ISSN 0067-0049.
- Gates, Evalyn (2009-01-27). Einstein's Telescope. New York: W. W. Norton & Company. ISBN 978-0-393-06238-0. OCLC 227016226.
