= P. K. Dave (lieutenant governor) =

15th lieutenant governor of Delhi

15th Lieutenant Governor of Delhi
- In office 4 May 1992 – 4 January 1997

Ambassador to Brussels
- In office 1977–1981

Advisor to the Governor of Tamil Nadu
- In office 1976–1977

Petroleum Secretary
- In office 1971–1976

Chief secretary of Jammu and Kashmir
- In office 1962–1971

Personal details
- Born: January 1, 1923 India
- Died: September 19, 2006 (aged 83) Delhi, India

P. K. Dave (Hindi: प. क. दावे; 1 January 1923 – 19 September 2006) was an Indian bureaucrat, civil servant, former Chief secretary of Jammu and Kashmir state and 15th lieutenant Governor of Delhi, served in office for over five years from 1992 to 1997.

== Education ==
He graduated from the Institute of Science, Nagpur, and later he was selected as an Indian Administrative Service (IAS) officer.

== Career ==
In 1967, he was first appointed as Chief Secretary to the government of Jammu and Kashmir until 1971, and later he served as Petroleum Secretary from 1971 to 1976. From 1976 to 1977, he served as Advisor to the governor of Tamil Nadu, and also Ambassador to Brussels from 1977 to 1981. He also served as Deputy Secretary to the government of Madhya Pradesh for Planning department until he retired in 1981.

In 2004, he was awarded Lifetime Achievement award in recognition of his service to the oil industry of India.

== Death ==
Deva was suffering from a medical condition. He died on 19 September 2006 in a hospital in Delhi following his chronic condition.
