= Dyck graph =

- The Dyck graph
- Named after: W. Dyck
- Vertices: 32
- Edges: 48
- Radius: 5
- Diameter: 5
- Girth: 6
- Automorphisms: 192
- Chromatic number: 2
- Chromatic index: 3
- Book thickness: 3
- Queue number: 2
- Properties: Symmetric; Cubic; Hamiltonian; Bipartite; Cayley graph

In the mathematical field of graph theory, the Dyck graph is a 3-regular graph with 32 vertices and 48 edges, named after Walther von Dyck.

It is Hamiltonian with 120 distinct Hamiltonian cycles. It has chromatic number 2, chromatic index 3, radius 5, diameter 5 and girth 6. It is also a 3-vertex-connected and a 3-edge-connected graph. It has book thickness 3 and queue number 2. The graph is 1-planar.

== Algebraic properties ==
The automorphism group of the Dyck graph is a group of order 192. It acts transitively on the vertices, on the edges and on the arcs of the graph. Therefore, the Dyck graph is a symmetric graph. It has automorphisms that take any vertex to any other vertex and any edge to any other edge. According to the Foster census, the Dyck graph, referenced as F32A, is the only cubic symmetric graph on 32 vertices.

The characteristic polynomial of the Dyck graph is equal to $(x-3) (x-1)^9 (x+1)^9 (x+3) (x^2-5)^6$.

== Toroidal graph ==
The Dyck graph is a toroidal graph, contained in the skeleton of a hexagonal regular map, {6,3}_{4,0}, with 32 vertices, 48 edges, and 16 hexagonal cycles. It is the dual of its symmetric toroidal embedding is the Shrikhande graph.

It can be visualized as net, a 4 by 4 array of hexagons, where left-right and top-bottom wrap into a flat torus.

Visualization as regular map and the dual graph regular map
Dyck graph on {6,3}_{4,0} 32 vertices, 48 edges, 16 hexagons	Shrikhande graph on {3,6}_{4,0} 16 vertices, 48 edges, 32 triangles

== Dyck map ==
The Dyck graph is the skeleton of a symmetric tessellation of a surface of genus three by twelve octagons, known as the Dyck map or Dyck tiling. The dual graph for this tiling is the complete tripartite graph K_{4,4,4}.

== Gallery ==
Alternative drawing of the Dyck graph.

The chromatic number of the Dyck graph is 2.

The chromatic index of the Dyck graph is 3.
