= Wilson operation =

6 operations in topological graph theory

A set of six regular maps related by the Wilson operations

In topological graph theory, the Wilson operations are a group of six transformations on graph embeddings. They are generated by two involutions on embeddings, surface duality and Petrie duality, and have the group structure of the symmetric group on three elements. They are named for Stephen E. Wilson, who published them for regular maps in 1979; they were extended to all cellular graph embeddings (embeddings all of whose faces are topological disks) by Lins (1982).

The operations are: identity, duality, Petrie duality, Petrie dual of dual, dual of Petrie dual, and dual of Petrie dual of dual or equivalently Petrie dual of dual of Petrie dual. Together they constitute the group S3.

These operations are characterized algebraically as the only outer automorphisms of certain group-theoretic representations of embedded graphs. Via their action on dessins d'enfants, they can be used to study the absolute Galois group of the rational numbers.

One can also define corresponding operations on the edges of an embedded graph, the partial dual and partial Petrie dual, such that performing the same operation on all edges simultaneously is equivalent to taking the surface dual or Petrie dual. These operations generate a larger group, the ribbon group, acting on the embedded graphs. As an abstract group, it is isomorphic to $S_3^m$, the $m$-fold product of copies of the three-element symmetric group.
