= Hemitesseract =

Abstract regular 4-polytope with 4 cubic cells

Hemitesseract (hemi-4-cube)
- Type: Regular projective 4-polytope
- Schläfli symbol: {4,3,3}/2 or {4,3,3}_{4}
- Cells: 4 {4,3}
- Faces: 12 {4}
- Edges: 16
- Vertices: 8
- Vertex figure: Tetrahedron
- Petrie polygon: Square
- Dual: hemi-16-cell

The skeleton is a cubic graph with added space diagonals.

The vertices correspond to the partitions of a 4-set into one or two parts.

In abstract geometry, a hemitesseract is an abstract, regular 4-polytope, existing in real projective space RP^{3}. It contains one k-face for each pair of opposite k-faces in the tesseract.

It has four cubic cells, 12 square faces, 16 edges, and 8 vertices. It has an unexpected property that every cell is in contact with every other cell on two faces, and every cell contains all the vertices, which gives an example of an abstract polytope whose faces are not determined by their vertex sets.

The following images show the four pairs of opposite cubes in the tesseract (each with two highlighted pairs of opposite squares). Below are the corresponding cubes in the hemitesseract.

tesseract	pairs of opposite tesseract cells
hemitesseract	hemitesseract cells

representations in cubic hull
These images show two ways to assign the vertices of a hemitesseract to those of a cube. One way is to assign each pair of tesseract vertices to the one with the smaller integer value, e.g. (0, 15) to 0 and (7, 8) to 7. Another way is to use the XOR between neighboring digits of the tesseract coordinates. This way (0011, 1100) is assigned to 010.

== As a graph ==
The skeleton is the complete bipartite graph K_{4,4}. The images show four white and four gray vertices (for even and odd binary weight of the tesseract coordinates). Each vertex of one color is connected to all vertices of the other (but to none of the same).
It is also the regular complex polygon _{2}{4}_{4}, a generalized cross polytope.

== As a configuration ==
The configuration matrix below represents the hemitesseract. The rows and columns correspond to vertices, edges, faces, and cells. The diagonal numbers say how many of each element occur in the whole hemitesseract. The nondiagonal numbers say how many of the column's element occur in or at the row's element. For example, the 2 in the first column of the second row indicates that there are 2 vertices in (i.e., at the extremes of) each edge; the 4 in the second column of the first row indicates that 4 edges meet at each vertex.

$$\begin{bmatrix}\begin{matrix}8 & 4 & 6 & 4 \\ 2 & 16 & 3 & 3 \\ 4 & 4 & 12 & 2 \\ 8 & 12 & 6 & 4 \end{matrix}\end{bmatrix}$$

== See also ==
- Hemicube (geometry)
