= Skew polygon =

Polygonal chain whose vertices are not all coplanar

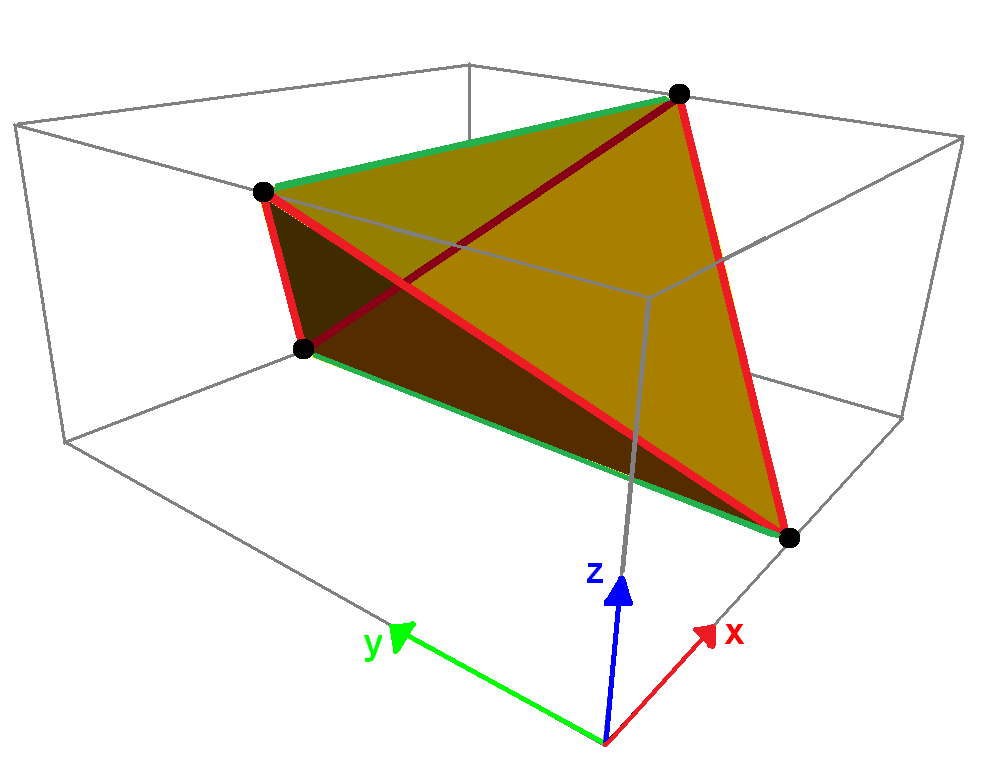
The red edges of this tetragonal disphenoid represent a regular zig-zag skew quadrilateral.

In geometry, a skew polygon is a closed polygonal chain in Euclidean space. It is a figure similar to a polygon except its vertices are not all coplanar. While a polygon is ordinarily defined as a plane figure, the edges and vertices of a skew polygon form a space curve. Skew polygons must have at least four vertices. The interior surface and corresponding area measure of such a polygon is not uniquely defined.

Skew infinite polygons (apeirogons) have vertices which are not all colinear.

A zig-zag skew polygon or antiprismatic polygon has vertices which alternate on two parallel planes, and thus must be even-sided.

Regular skew polygons in 3 dimensions (and regular skew apeirogons in two dimensions) are always zig-zag.

== Skew polygons in three dimensions ==
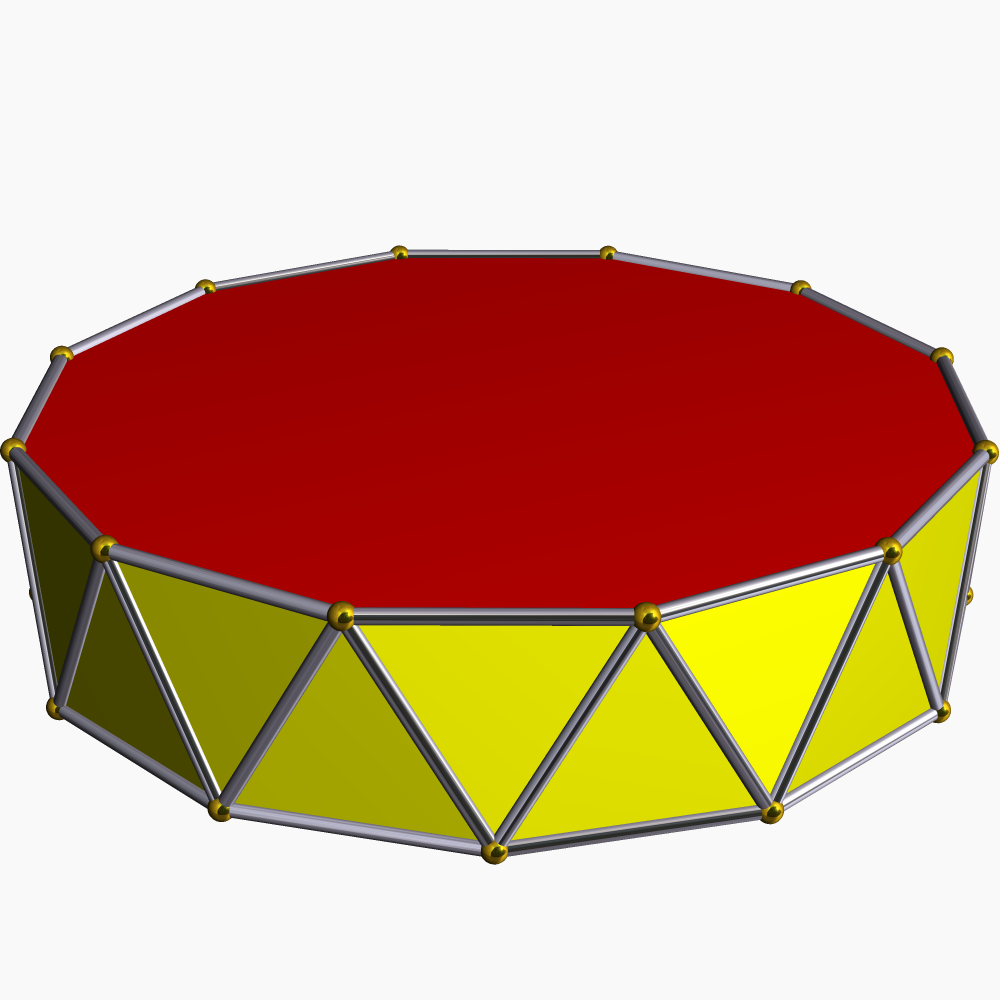
A uniform n-gonal antiprism has a 2n-sided regular skew polygon defined along its side edges.

A regular skew polygon is a faithful symmetric realization of a polygon in dimension greater than 2. In 3 dimensions a regular skew polygon has vertices alternating between two parallel planes.

A regular skew n-gon can be given a Schläfli symbol {p}#{} as a blend of a regular polygon {p} and an orthogonal line segment { }. The symmetry operation between sequential vertices is glide reflection.

Examples are shown on the uniform square and pentagon antiprisms. The star antiprisms also generate regular skew polygons with different connection order of the top and bottom polygons. The filled top and bottom polygons are drawn for structural clarity, and are not part of the skew polygons.

Regular zig-zag skew polygons
Skew square	Skew hexagon	Skew octagon	Skew decagon			Skew dodecagon
{4}#{ }	{6}#{ }	{8}#{ }	{10}#{ }	{5}#{ }	{5/2}#{ }	{12}#{ }
s{2,4}	s{2,6}	s{2,8}	s{2,10}	sr{2,5/2}	s{2,10/3}	s{2,12}

Petrie polygons are regular skew polygons defined within regular polyhedra and polytopes. For example, the five Platonic solids have 4-, 6-, and 10-sided regular skew polygons, as seen in these orthogonal projections with red edges around their respective projective envelopes. The tetrahedron and the octahedron include all the vertices in their respective zig-zag skew polygons, and can be seen as a digonal antiprism and a triangular antiprism respectively.

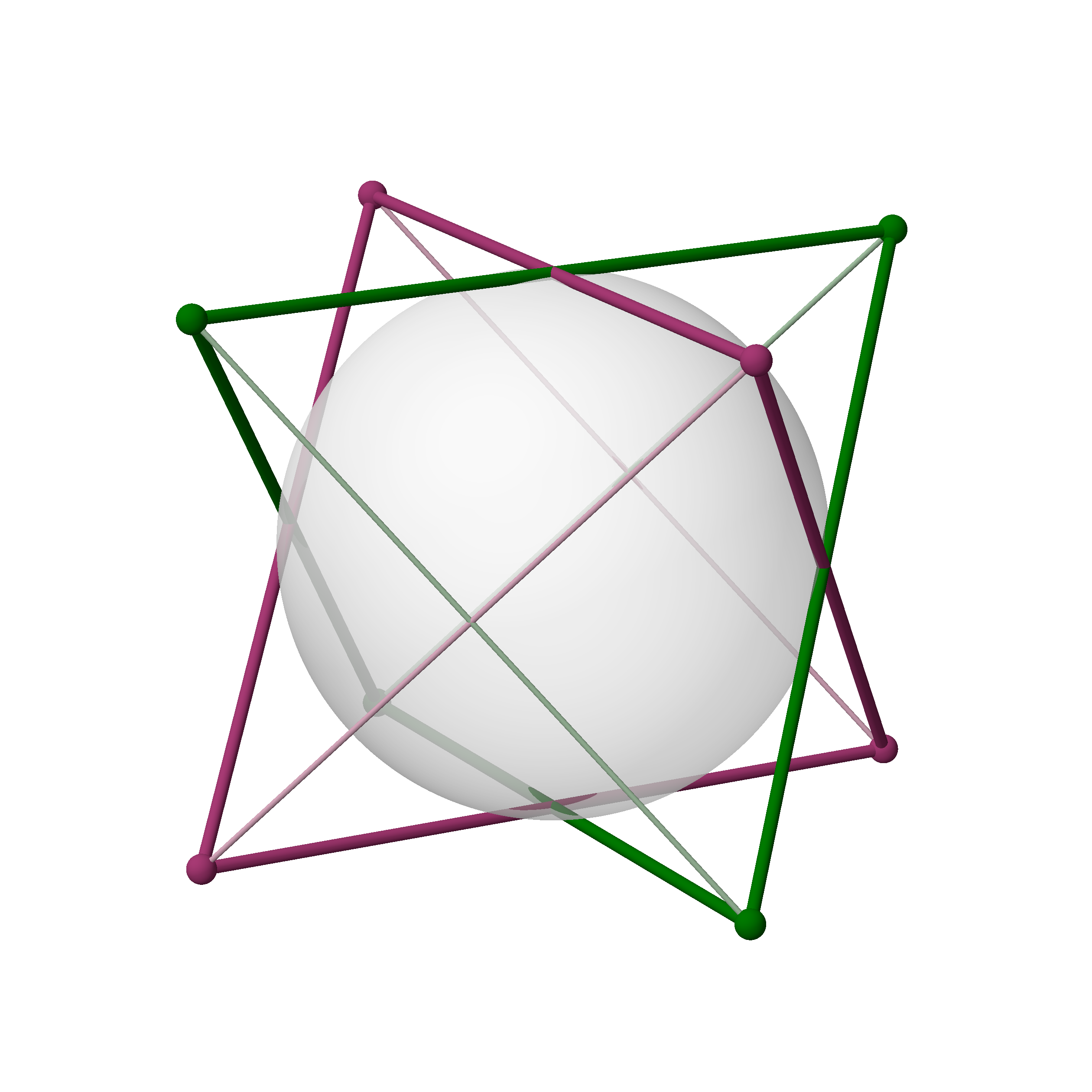
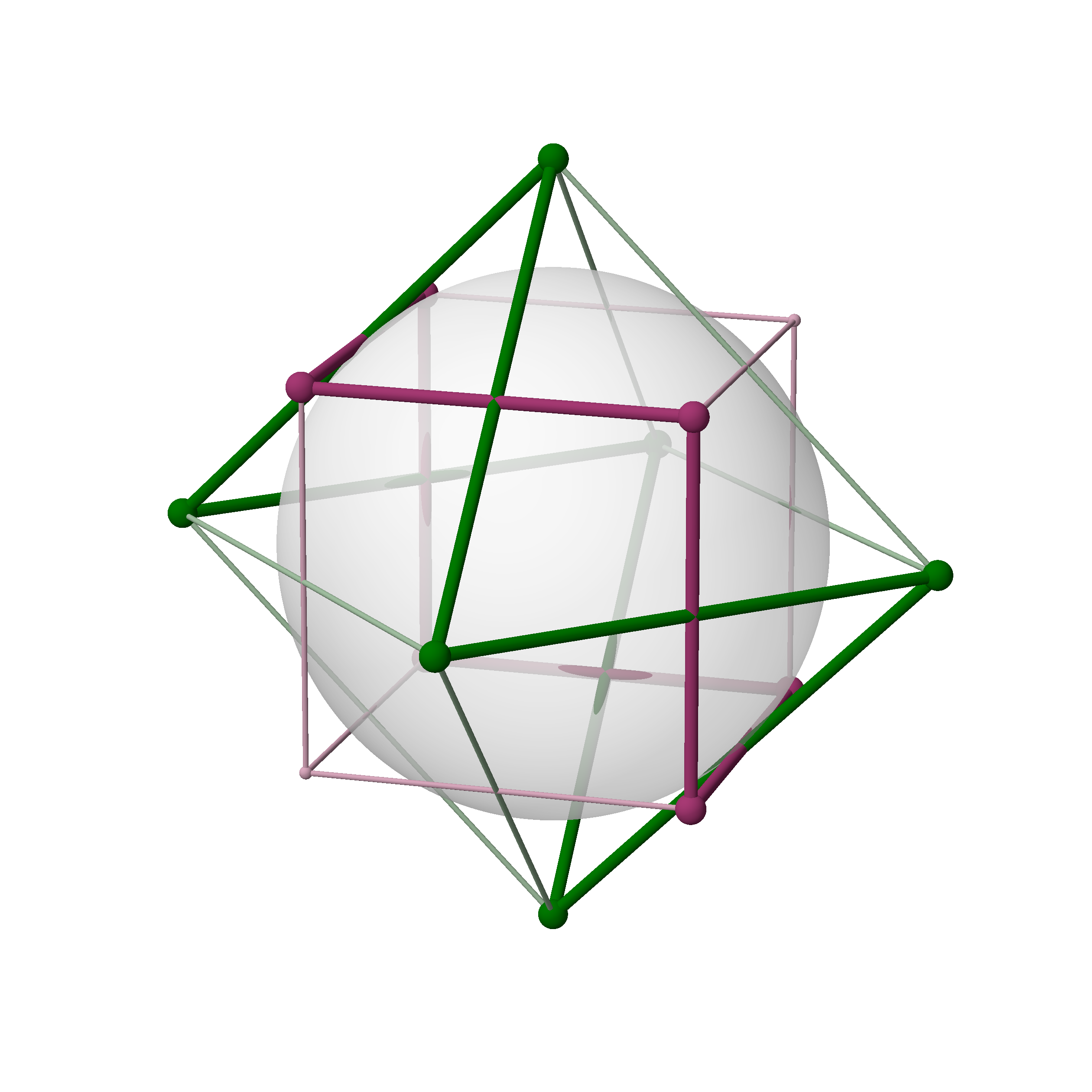
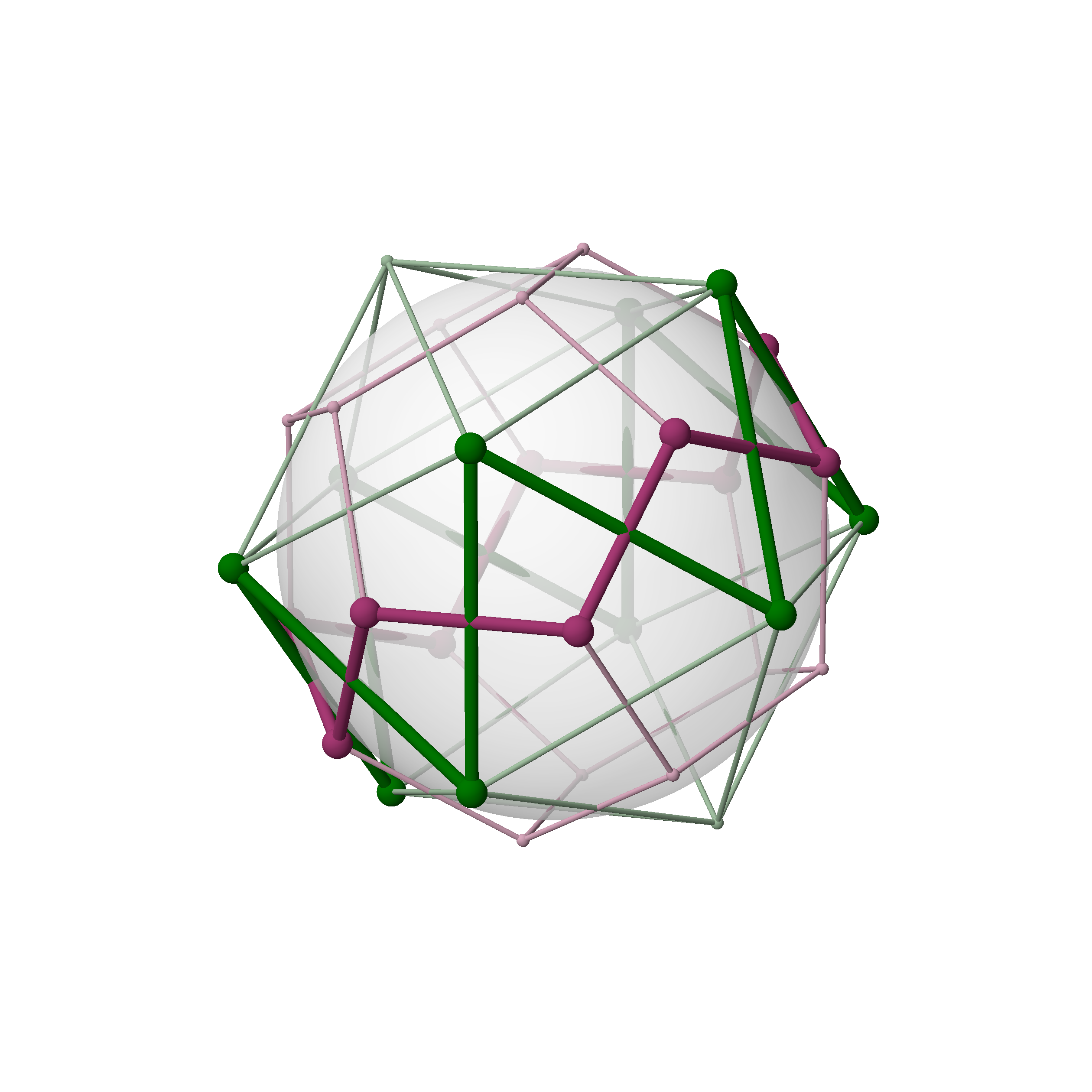
Petrie polygons of Platonic solids

== Regular skew polygon as vertex figure of regular skew polyhedron ==
A regular skew polyhedron has regular polygon faces, and a regular skew polygon vertex figure.

Three infinite regular skew polyhedra are space-filling in 3-space; others exist in 4-space, some within the uniform 4-polytopes.

Skew vertex figures of the 3 infinite regular skew polyhedra
{4,6|4}	{6,4|4}	{6,6|3}
Regular skew hexagon {3}#{ }	Regular skew square {2}#{ }	Regular skew hexagon {3}#{ }

== Regular skew polygons in four dimensions ==
In 4 dimensions, a regular skew polygon can have vertices on a Clifford torus and related by a Clifford displacement. Unlike zig-zag skew polygons, skew polygons on double rotations can include an odd-number of sides.

The Petrie polygons of the regular 4-polytopes define regular zig-zag skew polygons. The Coxeter number for each coxeter group symmetry expresses how many sides a Petrie polygon has. This is 5 sides for a 5-cell, 8 sides for a tesseract and 16-cell, 12 sides for a 24-cell, and 30 sides for a 120-cell and 600-cell.

When orthogonally projected onto the Coxeter plane, these regular skew polygons appear as regular polygon envelopes in the plane.

A_{4}, [3,3,3]	B_{4}, [4,3,3]		F_{4}, [3,4,3]	H_{4}, [5,3,3]	
Pentagon	Octagon		Dodecagon	Triacontagon	
5-cell {3,3,3}	tesseract {4,3,3}	16-cell {3,3,4}	24-cell {3,4,3}	120-cell {5,3,3}	600-cell {3,3,5}

The n-n duoprisms and dual duopyramids also have 2n-gonal Petrie polygons. (The tesseract is a 4-4 duoprism, and the 16-cell is a 4-4 duopyramid.)

Hexagon		Decagon		Dodecagon	
3-3 duoprism	3-3 duopyramid	5-5 duoprism	5-5 duopyramid	6-6 duoprism	6-6 duopyramid

== See also ==
- Petrie polygon
- Skew quadrilateral
- Regular skew polyhedron
- Skew apeirohedron (infinite skew polyhedron)
- Skew lines
