= Skew apeirohedron =

Infinite polyhedron with non-planar faces

In geometry, a skew apeirohedron is an infinite skew polyhedron consisting of nonplanar faces or nonplanar vertex figures, allowing the figure to extend indefinitely without folding round to form a closed surface.

Skew apeirohedra have also been called polyhedral sponges.

Many are directly related to a convex uniform honeycomb, being the polygonal surface of a honeycomb with some of the cells removed. Characteristically, an infinite skew polyhedron divides 3-dimensional space into two halves. If one half is thought of as solid the figure is sometimes called a partial honeycomb.

== Regular skew apeirohedra ==
According to Coxeter, in 1926 John Flinders Petrie generalized the concept of regular skew polygons (nonplanar polygons) to regular skew polyhedra (apeirohedra).

Coxeter and Petrie found three of these that filled 3-space:

Regular skew apeirohedra
{4,6|4} mucube	{6,4|4} muoctahedron	{6,6|3} mutetrahedron

There also exist chiral skew apeirohedra of types {4,6}, {6,4}, and {6,6}. These skew apeirohedra are vertex-transitive, edge-transitive, and face-transitive, but not mirror symmetric (Schulte 2004).

Beyond Euclidean 3-space, in 1967 C. W. L. Garner published a set of 31 regular skew polyhedra in hyperbolic 3-space.

== Gott's regular pseudopolyhedrons ==
J. Richard Gott in 1967 published a larger set of seven infinite skew polyhedra which he called regular pseudopolyhedrons, including the three from Coxeter as {4,6}, {6,4}, and {6,6} and four new ones: {5,5}, {4,5}, {3,8}, {3,10}.

Gott relaxed the definition of regularity to allow his new figures. Where Coxeter and Petrie had required that the vertices be symmetrical, Gott required only that they be congruent. Thus, Gott's new examples are not regular by Coxeter and Petrie's definition.

Gott called the full set of regular polyhedra, regular tilings, and regular pseudopolyhedra as regular generalized polyhedra, representable by a {p,q} Schläfli symbol, with by p-gonal faces, q around each vertex. However neither the term "pseudopolyhedron" nor Gott's definition of regularity have achieved wide usage.

Crystallographer A.F. Wells in 1960's also published a list of skew apeirohedra. Melinda Green published many more in 1998.

{p,q}	Cells around a vertex	Vertex faces	Larger pattern	Space group			Related H^{2} orbifold notation
{p,q}	Cells around a vertex	Vertex faces	Larger pattern	Cubic space group	Coxeter notation	Fibrifold notation	Related H^{2} orbifold notation
{4,5}	3 cubes			Im3̅m	[[4,3,4]]	8°:2	*4222
{4,5}	1 truncated octahedron 2 hexagonal prisms			I3̅	[[4,3^{+},4]]	8°:2	2*42
{3,7}	1 octahedron 1 icosahedron			Fd3̅	[[3^{[4]}]]^{+}	2°^{−}	3222
{3,8}	2 snub cubes			Fm3̅m	[4,(3,4)^{+}]	2^{−−}	32*
{3,9}	1 tetrahedron 3 octahedra			Fd3̅m	[[3^{[4]}]]	2^{+}:2	2*32
{3,9}	1 icosahedron 2 octahedra			I3̅	[[4,3^{+},4]]	8°:2	22*2
{3,12}	5 octahedra			Im3̅m	[[4,3,4]]	8°:2	2*32

=== Prismatic forms ===
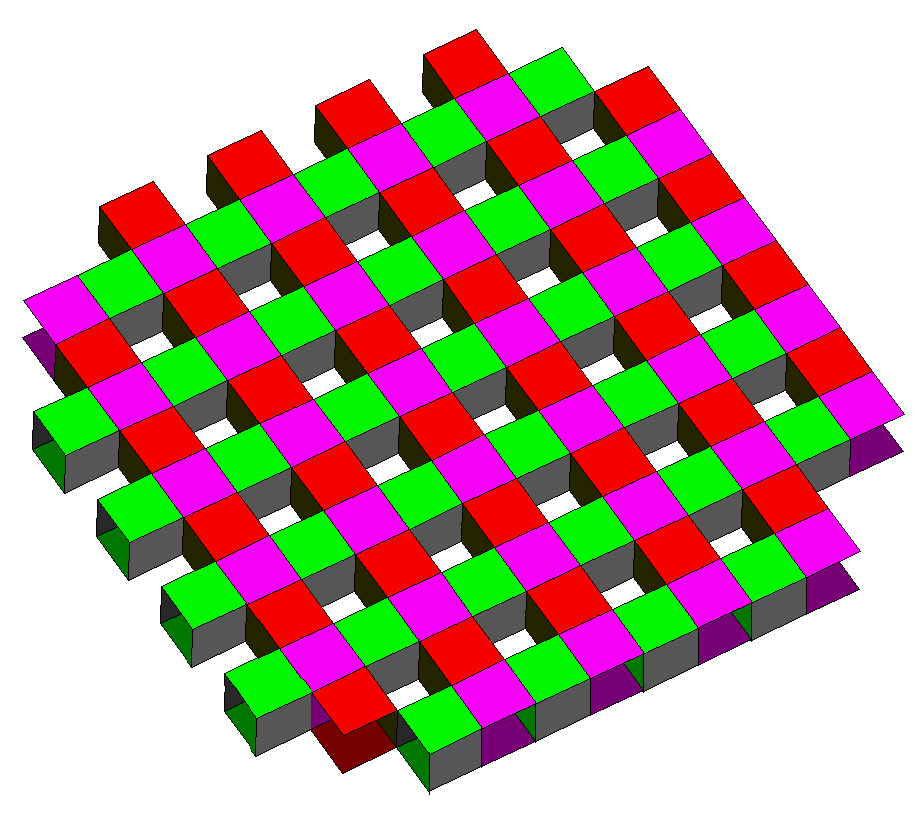
Prismatic form: {4,5}

There are two prismatic forms:

1. {4,5}: 5 squares on a vertex (Two parallel square tilings connected by cubic holes.)
2. {3,8}: 8 triangles on a vertex (Two parallel triangle tilings connected by octahedral holes.)

=== Other forms ===
{3,10} is also formed from parallel planes of triangular tilings, with alternating octahedral holes going both ways.

{5,5} is composed of 3 coplanar pentagons around a vertex and two perpendicular pentagons filling the gap.

Gott also acknowledged that there are other periodic forms of the regular planar tessellations. Both the square tiling {4,4} and triangular tiling {3,6} can be curved into approximating infinite cylinders in 3-space.

=== Theorems ===
He wrote some theorems:

1. For every regular polyhedron {p,q}: (p−2)*(q−2)<4. For Every regular tessellation: (p−2)*(q−2)=4. For every regular pseudopolyhedron: (p−2)*(q−2)>4.
2. The number of faces surrounding a given face is p*(q−2) in any regular generalized polyhedron.
3. Every regular pseudopolyhedron approximates a negatively curved surface.
4. The seven regular pseudopolyhedra are repeating structures.

== Uniform skew apeirohedra ==
There are many other uniform (vertex-transitive) skew apeirohedra. Wachmann, Burt and Kleinmann (1974) discovered many examples but it is not known whether their list is complete.

A few are illustrated here. They can be named by their vertex configuration, although it is not a unique designation for skew forms.

Uniform skew apeirohedra related to uniform honeycombs
4.4.6.6		6.6.8.8
Related to cantitruncated cubic honeycomb,		Related to runcicantic cubic honeycomb,
4.4.4.6	4.8.4.8	3.3.3.3.3.3.3
Related to the omnitruncated cubic honeycomb:
4.4.4.6	4.4.4.8	3.4.4.4.4
		Related to the runcitruncated cubic honeycomb.

Prismatic uniform skew apeirohedra
4.4.4.4.4	4.4.4.6
Related to	Related to

Others can be constructed as augmented chains of polyhedra:

Uniform Boerdijk–Coxeter helix	Stacks of cubes

== See also ==
- Petrie polygon
- Regular skew polyhedron
