= Regular skew polyhedron =

Polyhedron with non-planar faces

In geometry, the regular skew polyhedra are generalizations to the set of regular polyhedra which include the possibility of nonplanar faces or vertex figures. Coxeter looked at skew vertex figures which created new 4-dimensional regular polyhedra, and much later Branko Grünbaum looked at regular skew faces.

Infinite regular skew polyhedra that span 3-space or higher are called regular skew apeirohedra.

== History ==
According to Coxeter, in 1926 John Flinders Petrie generalized the concept of regular skew polygons (nonplanar polygons) to regular skew polyhedra.

Coxeter offered a modified Schläfli symbol {l,m|n} for these figures, with {l,m} implying the vertex figure, m l-gons around a vertex, and n-gonal holes. Their vertex figures are skew polygons, zig-zagging between two planes.

The regular skew polyhedra, represented by {l,m|n}, follow this equation:

$$2 \cos \frac{\pi}{l} \cos \frac{\pi}{m} = \cos \frac{\pi}{n}$$

A first set {l,m|n}, repeats the five convex Platonic solids, and one nonconvex Kepler–Poinsot solid:

{l,m|n}	Faces	Edges	Vertices	p	Polyhedron	Symmetry order
{3,3| 3} = {3,3}	4	6	4	0	Tetrahedron	12
{3,4| 4} = {3,4}	8	12	6	0	Octahedron	24
{4,3| 4} = {4,3}	6	12	8	0	Cube	24
{3,5| 5} = {3,5}	20	30	12	0	Icosahedron	60
{5,3| 5} = {5,3}	12	30	20	0	Dodecahedron	60
{5,5| 3} = {5,5/2}	12	30	12	4	Great dodecahedron	60

== Finite regular skew polyhedra ==
A4 Coxeter plane projections
{4, 6 | 3}	{6, 4 | 3}
Runcinated 5-cell (20 vertices, 60 edges)	Bitruncated 5-cell (30 vertices, 60 edges)
F4 Coxeter plane projections
{4, 8 | 3}	{8, 4 | 3}
Runcinated 24-cell (144 vertices, 576 edges)	Bitruncated 24-cell (288 vertices, 576 edges)
{3,8|,4} = {3,8}_{8}	{4,6|,3} = {4,6}_{6}
42 vertices, 168 edges	56 vertices, 168 edges
Some of the 4-dimensional regular skew polyhedra fits inside the uniform polychora as shown in the top 4 projections.

Coxeter also enumerated the a larger set of finite regular polyhedra in his paper "regular skew polyhedra in three and four dimensions, and their topological analogues".

Just like the infinite skew polyhedra represent manifold surfaces between the cells of the convex uniform honeycombs, the finite forms all represent manifold surfaces within the cells of the uniform 4-polytopes.

Polyhedra of the form {2p, 2q | r} are related to Coxeter group symmetry of [(p,r,q,r)], which reduces to the linear [r,p,r] when q is 2. Coxeter gives these symmetry as [[(p,r,q,r)]^{+}] which he says is isomorphic to his abstract group (2p,2q|2,r). The related honeycomb has the extended symmetry [[(p,r,q,r)]].

{2p,4|r} is represented by the {2p} faces of the bitruncated {r,p,r} uniform 4-polytope, and {4,2p|r} is represented by square faces of the runcinated {r,p,r}.

{4,4|n} produces a n-n duoprism, and specifically {4,4|4} fits inside of a {4}x{4} tesseract.

The {4,4| n} solutions represent the square faces of the duoprisms, with the n-gonal faces as holes and represent a Clifford torus, and an approximation of a duocylinder	{4,4|6} has 36 square faces, seen in perspective projection as squares extracted from a 6,6 duoprism.	{4,4|4} has 16 square faces and exists as a subset of faces in a tesseract.

Finite polyhedra in 4 dimensions
{l, m | n}	Faces	Edges	Vertices	p	Structure	Symmetry	Order	Related uniform polychora
{4,4| 3}	9	18	9	1	D_{3}xD_{3}	[[3,2,3]^{+}]	9	3-3 duoprism
{4,4| 4}	16	32	16	1	D_{4}xD_{4}	[[4,2,4]^{+}]	16	4-4 duoprism or tesseract
{4,4| 5}	25	50	25	1	D_{5}xD_{5}	[[5,2,5]^{+}]	25	5-5 duoprism
{4,4| 6}	36	72	36	1	D_{6}xD_{6}	[[6,2,6]^{+}]	36	6-6 duoprism
{4,4| n}	n^{2}	2n^{2}	n^{2}	1	D_{n}xD_{n}	[[n,2,n]^{+}]	n^{2}	n-n duoprism
{4,6| 3}	30	60	20	6	S5	[[3,3,3]^{+}]	60	Runcinated 5-cell
{6,4| 3}	20	60	30	6	S5	[[3,3,3]^{+}]	60	Bitruncated 5-cell
{4,8| 3}	288	576	144	73		[[3,4,3]^{+}]	576	Runcinated 24-cell
{8,4| 3}	144	576	288	73		[[3,4,3]^{+}]	576	Bitruncated 24-cell

pentagrammic solutions
{l, m | n}	Faces	Edges	Vertices	p	Structure	Symmetry	Order	Related uniform polychora
{4,5| 5}	90	180	72	10	A6	[[5/2,5,5/2]^{+}]	360	Runcinated grand stellated 120-cell
{5,4| 5}	72	180	90	10	A6	[[5/2,5,5/2]^{+}]	360	Bitruncated grand stellated 120-cell

{4,5| 4} can be realized within the 32 vertices and 80 edges of a 5-cube, seen here in B5 Coxeter plane projection showing vertices and edges. The 80 square faces of the 5-cube become 40 square faces of the skew polyhedron and 40 square holes.

{l, m | n}	Faces	Edges	Vertices	p	Structure	Order	Related uniform polytopes
{4,5| 4}	40	80	32	5	?	160	5-cube vertices (±1,±1,±1,±1,±1) and edges
{5,4| 4}	32	80	40	5	?	160	Rectified 5-orthoplex vertices (±1,±1,0,0,0)
{4,7| 3}	42	84	24	10	LF(2,7)	168	
{7,4| 3}	24	84	42	10	LF(2,7)	168	
{5,5| 4}	72	180	72	19	A6	360	
{6,7| 3}	182	546	156	105	LF(2,13)	1092	
{7,6| 3}	156	546	182	105	LF(2,13)	1092	
{7,7| 3}	156	546	156	118	LF(2,13)	1092	
{4,9| 3}	612	1224	272	171	LF(2,17)	2448	
{9,4| 3}	272	1224	612	171	LF(2,17)	2448	
{7,8| 3}	1536	5376	1344	1249	?	10752	
{8,7| 3}	1344	5376	1536	1249	?	10752	

A final set is based on Coxeter's further extended form {q1,m|q2,q3...} or with q2 unspecified: {l, m |, q}. These can also be represented a regular finite map or {l, m}_{2q}, and group G^{l,m,q}.

{l, m |, q} or {l, m}_{2q}	Faces	Edges	Vertices	p	Structure	Order	Related complex polyhedra
{3,6|,q} = {3,6}_{2q}	2q^{2}	3q^{2}	q^{2}	1	G^{3,6,2q}	2q^{2}	
{3,2q|,3} = {3,2q}_{6}	2q^{2}	3q^{2}	3q	(q−1)*(q−2)/2	G^{3,6,2q}	2q^{2}	
{3,7|,4} = {3,7}_{8}	56	84	24	3	LF(2,7)	168	
{3,8|,4} = {3,8}_{8}	112	168	42	8	PGL(2,7)	336	(1 1 1_{1}^{4})^{4},
{4,6|,3} = {4,6}_{6}	84	168	56	15	PGL(2,7)	336	(1^{4} 1^{4} 1_{1})^{(3)},
{3,7|,6} = {3,7}_{12}	364	546	156	14	LF(2,13)	1092	
{3,7|,7} = {3,7}_{14}	364	546	156	14	LF(2,13)	1092	
{3,8|,5} = {3,8}_{10}	720	1080	270	46	G^{3,8,10}	2160	(1 1 1_{1}^{4})^{5},
{3,10|,4} = {3,10}_{8}	720	1080	216	73	G^{3,8,10}	2160	(1 1 1_{1}^{5})^{4},
{4,6|,2} = {4,6}_{4}	12	24	8	3	S4×S2	48	
{5,6|,2} = {5,6}_{4}	24	60	20	9	A5×S2	120	
{3,11|,4} = {3,11}_{8}	2024	3036	552	231	LF(2,23)	6072	
{3,7|,8} = {3,7}_{16}	3584	5376	1536	129	G^{3,7,17}	10752	
{3,9|,5} = {3,9}_{10}	12180	18270	4060	1016	LF(2,29)×A3	36540	

== Higher dimensions ==
Regular skew polyhedra can also be constructed in dimensions higher than 4 as embeddings into regular polytopes or honeycombs. For example, the regular icosahedron can be embedded into the vertices of the 6-demicube; this was named the regular skew icosahedron by H. S. M. Coxeter. The dodecahedron can be similarly embedded into the 10-demicube.

== See also ==
- Skew polygon
- Infinite skew polyhedron
