= Cleveland Museum of Natural History =

Museum in Cleveland, Ohio, US

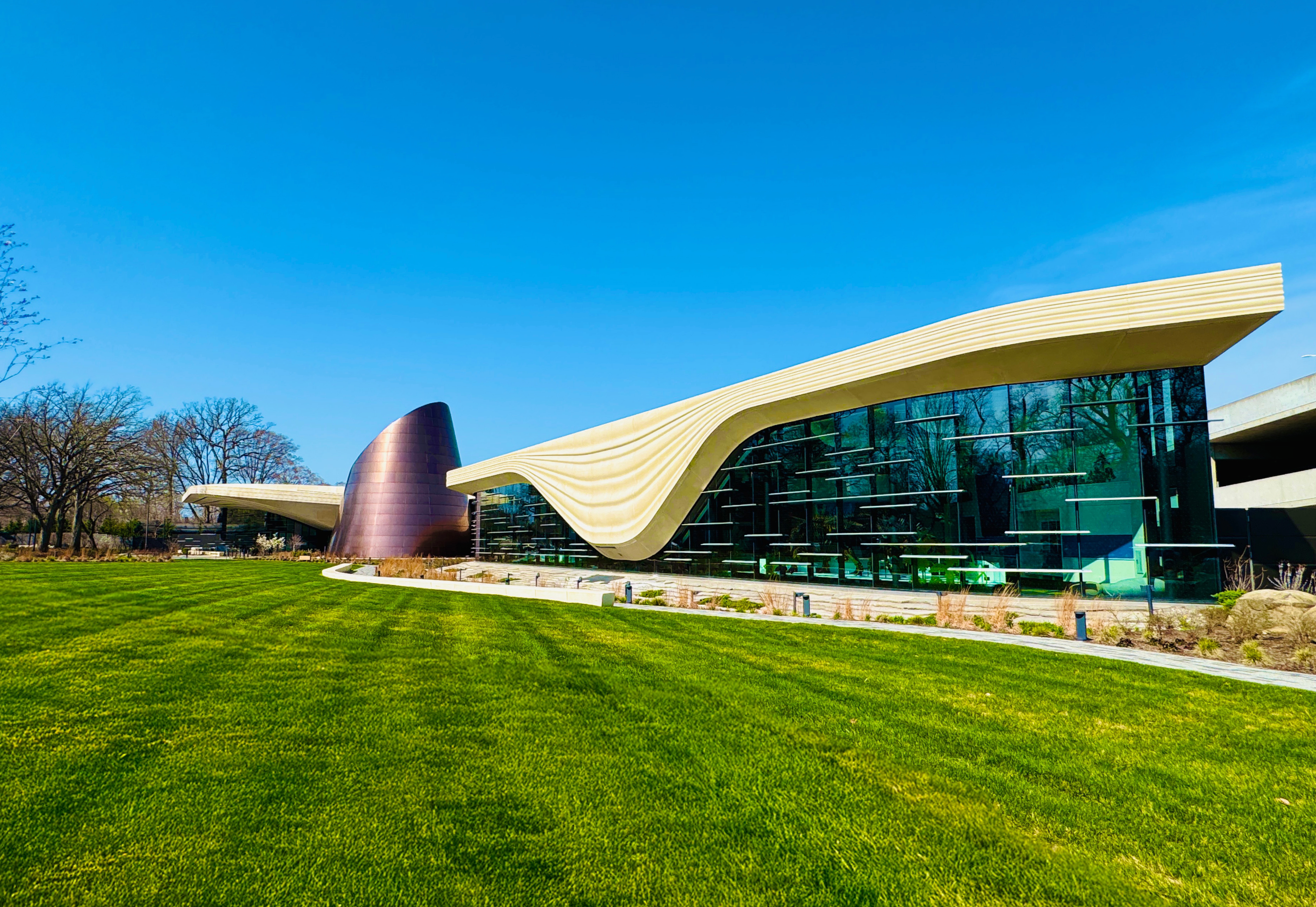
- Exterior of the Cleveland Museum of Natural History in Spring 2025
- Established: 1920; 106 years ago
- Location: 1 Wade Oval Drive; Cleveland, Ohio 44106; U.S.
- Coordinates: 41°30′41.6″N 81°36′47.1″W
- Visitors: 260,000
- President: Sonia Winner
- Website: www.cmnh.org

The Cleveland Museum of Natural History is a natural history museum in University Circle, a district of educational, cultural and medical institutions approximately five miles (8 km) east of Downtown Cleveland, Ohio, United States. The museum was established in 1920 by Cyrus S. Eaton to perform research, education and development of collections in the fields of anthropology, archaeology, astronomy, botany, geology, paleontology, wildlife biology, and zoology. The museum traces its roots to the Ark, formed in 1836 on Cleveland's Public Square by William Case, the Academy of Natural Science formed by William Case and Jared Potter Kirtland, and the Kirtland Society of Natural History, founded in 1869 and reinvigorated in 1922 by the trustees of the Cleveland Museum of Natural History.

Donald Johanson was the Museum's Curator of Physical Anthropology when he discovered "Lucy," the skeletal remains of the ancient hominid Australopithecus afarensis. The current curators of the Anthropological Sciences department include Nicole Burt, Ph.D. Curator of Human Health & Evolutionary Medicine; Emma Finestone, Associate Curator and the Robert J. and Linnet E. Fritz Endowed Chair of Human Origins; and Elizabeth (Ebeth) Sawchuk, Associate Curator of Human Evolution.

The museum has embarked on a multi-year, $150 million renovation and expansion project. DLR Group was selected to design the project in June 2019, and the museum broke ground on its new visitor hall, lobby and exhibit wing in June 2021. The renovation was completed in December 2024.

== History ==
The Cleveland Museum of Natural History traces its founding, in part, back to the 1830s. A two-room frame house located on the northeast side of Public Square, known as the Ark, housed taxidermy ranging from birds to reptiles and mammals. This was the collection of Leonard Case Sr., who passed the collection and building to his sons, Leonard Case Jr. and William Case. The Ark was frequented by a group of 26 men known as Arkites. These men collected, researched, and discussed findings with each other. There were no museums in Cleveland at the time.

In 1876 the Ark moved to nearby Case Hall. The original structure was torn down to build a post office. The collection remained there until 1916, when the facility was converted to the Cleveland Public Library.

The Cleveland Museum of Natural History, as it is known today, was founded in 1920. It was located in an office of the Lennox Building. At the end of the following year, the museum moved to a mansion on Euclid Avenue, a part of Cleveland's millionaires' row. This location was first opened to the public June 24, 1922.

The museum received the precious stone collection of Jeptha Wade II, after his death in 1926. In 1930, the museum organized an ornithological safari to Kenya, expanding the Case collection. The Haplocanthosaurus dinosaur, discovered by museum crew in 1954, is one of the most complete examples ever found of this 70-footlong sauropod. Beyond their walls, the museum participated in the operation of the Cleveland Zoo from 1940 and 1975; it also served as a leading force behind the creation of the Cleveland Aquarium, which it administered until 1985. In 1995 the museum maintained 12 natural areas in surrounding counties as sanctuaries.

In 1958, the museum moved to its current location in University Circle at Wade Park. The new, two-level building housed exhibits and educational activities, while the collections were stored off-site. Additions quickly followed, including an observatory, planetarium and the Kirtland Hall of Nature.

The Ralph Mueller Observatory opened in December 1960. It houses a 10½-inch refracting telescope built by the Warner & Swasey Co. of Cleveland in 1899. J.A. Brashear Company of Pittsburgh, Pennsylvania, a division of American Optical Company, ground the optics. Warner & Swasey Co. originally donated the telescope to Western Reserve College (now Case Western Reserve University). It was located on the roof of the university's physics building for 61 years before being acquired by the museum.

An 85,000 square feet addition in 1972 enlarged the museum, adding galleries, the Murch Auditorium, the Harold T. Clark Library and Rare Book Room, classrooms, a paleontology laboratory, and the front entrance and lobby. This created a circular building with a courtyard in the middle.

In 1973, curator Donald Johanson joined an archeological expedition in Ethiopia, where he discovered "Lucy," deemed one of the most important fossil finds in human evolutionary studies. This Australopithecus afarensis demonstrated modern upright walking in a 3.2 million-year-old female hominin.

A new 62,000-square-foot wing on the back of the museum was completed in 1989. It added a large exhibit hall for traveling exhibits, as well as an expanded gift shop and three floors for collections and administrative offices.

In January 2002, Shafran Planetarium opened to the public. Designed by Cleveland architectural and engineering firm Westlake Reed Leskosky (now DLR Group), the building exterior functions as an astronomical instrument. Nightly, visitors can use the building's angled roof to locate Polaris. The building's titanium-coated, stainless-steel outer covering sparkles with stars created by embedded fiber-optic lighting. This system emits a subtle glow without contributing to the light pollution above University Circle.

DLR Group was selected to design a renovation of the museum in June 2019. On June 24, 2021, a groundbreaking ceremony took place for an expansion as part of the museum's Centennial Transformation Project. The design is said to evoke the melting ice that made the Great Lakes region and the impact of water on the communities. The project was originally expected to be completed in 2026 and is proposed to cost $150 million. The renovation includes two halls—Dynamic Earth, covering 50,000 square feet (4,600 m^{2}), and Evolving Life, covering 25,000 square feet (2,300 m^{2})—as well as a new facade. A new entrance and other upgrades opened in December 2022, and a new visitor hall opened at the museum in October 2023. Dynamic Earth, Evolving Life, and several other renovated exhibition halls opened on December 13–15, 2024, two years ahead of the original schedule. The project expanded the museum's total space to 375,000 square feet (34,800 m^{2}).

== Collections ==
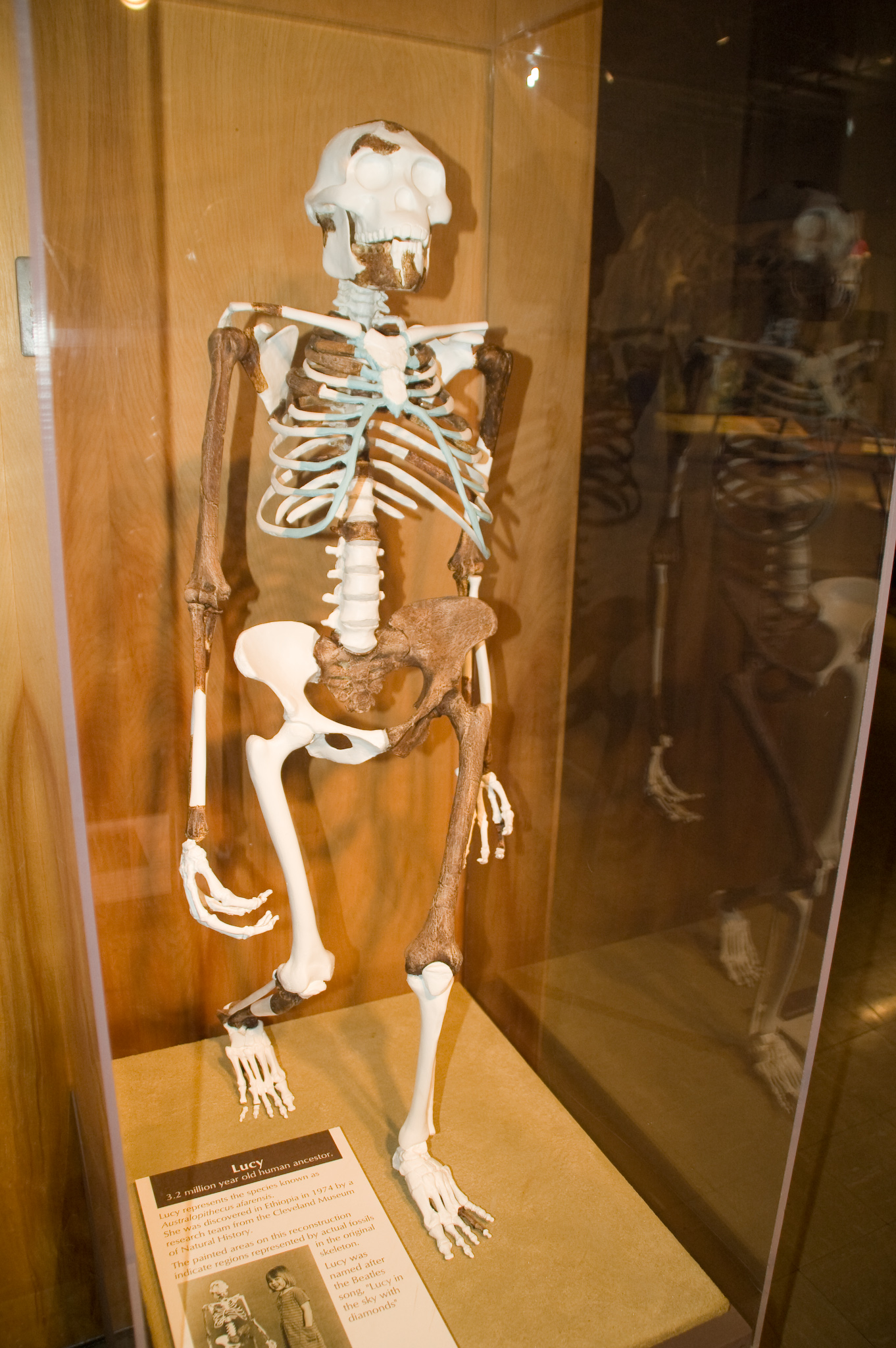
The museum's cast of Lucy

Museum collections contain millions of specimens, including specimens from paleontology, zoology, archaeology, mineralogy, ornithology, and a variety of other scientific subjects.

Key objects and specimens in the museum's collection include:

- An extensive collection of Late Devonian fossil fish from the Cleveland Shale, including several mounted skulls of the arthrodire placoderm Dunkleosteus. Many of these fossils and their casts are now on display in the new museum.
- Nine hundred monkey and ape skeletons, and more than 3,100 human skeletons (the Hamann-Todd Collection).
- A skull that is the holotype for the tyrannosaur species Nanotyrannus lancensis. This skull was discovered by a field crew led by former CMNH curator David Dunkle.
- The holotype of the Haplocanthosaurus sauropod, nicknamed "Happy," is now on display in the museum's Visitor Hall as of October 2023.
- On display in the Museum's Evolving Life Wing is the most complete mount of a Coelophysis bauri, which is a composite skeleton composed of multiple adult skeletons from the famous quarry at Ghost Ranch, New Mexico.
- In the Museum's Visitor Hall you can view the mounted taxidermy remains of Balto the sled dog, as of October 2023.
- An extensive mineralogy collection that includes a Moon rock and the Jeptha Wade gem collection. As of October 2023, a portion of this collection is on display in the museum's Visitor Hall.
- Currently on display in the museum's Dynamic Earth Wing are replica skeletons of Triceratops, an adult Tyrannosaurus , and Jane, a juvenile tyrannosaurid designated as the species Nanotyrannus lethaeus. Jane is currently on display in the Cleveland Hopkins International Airport.
- There is currently a mammoth on display in the Museum's Evolving Life Wing and the museum has multiple mastodon and mammoth specimens.
- A cast and a lifelike recreation of an Australopithecus afarensis skeleton, an early hominid affectionately dubbed Lucy.
- A partial Allosaurus skeleton is currently on display in the museum's Evolving Life Wing.
- A collection of 30,000 plant fossils acquired from the University of Cincinnati by former curator of paleobotany, Shya Chitaley.
- An upgraded pendulum was installed in the Dynamic Earth Wing as part of the museum's transformation and there is a Foucault pendulum underneath in which the Bicentennial Education Time Capsule was buried in 1996 and will be opened in 2046.

The museum has made many discoveries over the years. A new ceratopsian, Albertaceratops nesmoi, was named in 2007 by former CMNH curator of Vertebrate Paleontology Michael Ryan.

=== Hamann-Todd Collection ===
The Hamann-Todd Collection is a collection of more than 3100 human skeletons and over 900 primate skeletons that were assembled starting in 1893. The collection was originally housed at Western Reserve University Medical School in a new medical building that was built for that purpose. The first floor of this building contained the Hamann Museum of Comparative Anthropology and Anatomy. However, due to the costs of storing the bones, the collection was transferred to the Cleveland Museum of Natural History.

In 1893, Carl August Hamann initiated the collection. Its administration was taken over by T. Wingate Todd after Hamann was named dean of Western Reserve University's medical school in 1912. Todd managed to assemble the great majority of the human skeletons in the collection, over 3000, before his death in 1938.

=== Perkins Wildlife Center ===
The Ralph Perkins II Wildlife Center and Woods Garden presented by KeyBank, which includes live animals and plants native to Ohio, opened on September 3, 2016.

=== Artwork ===
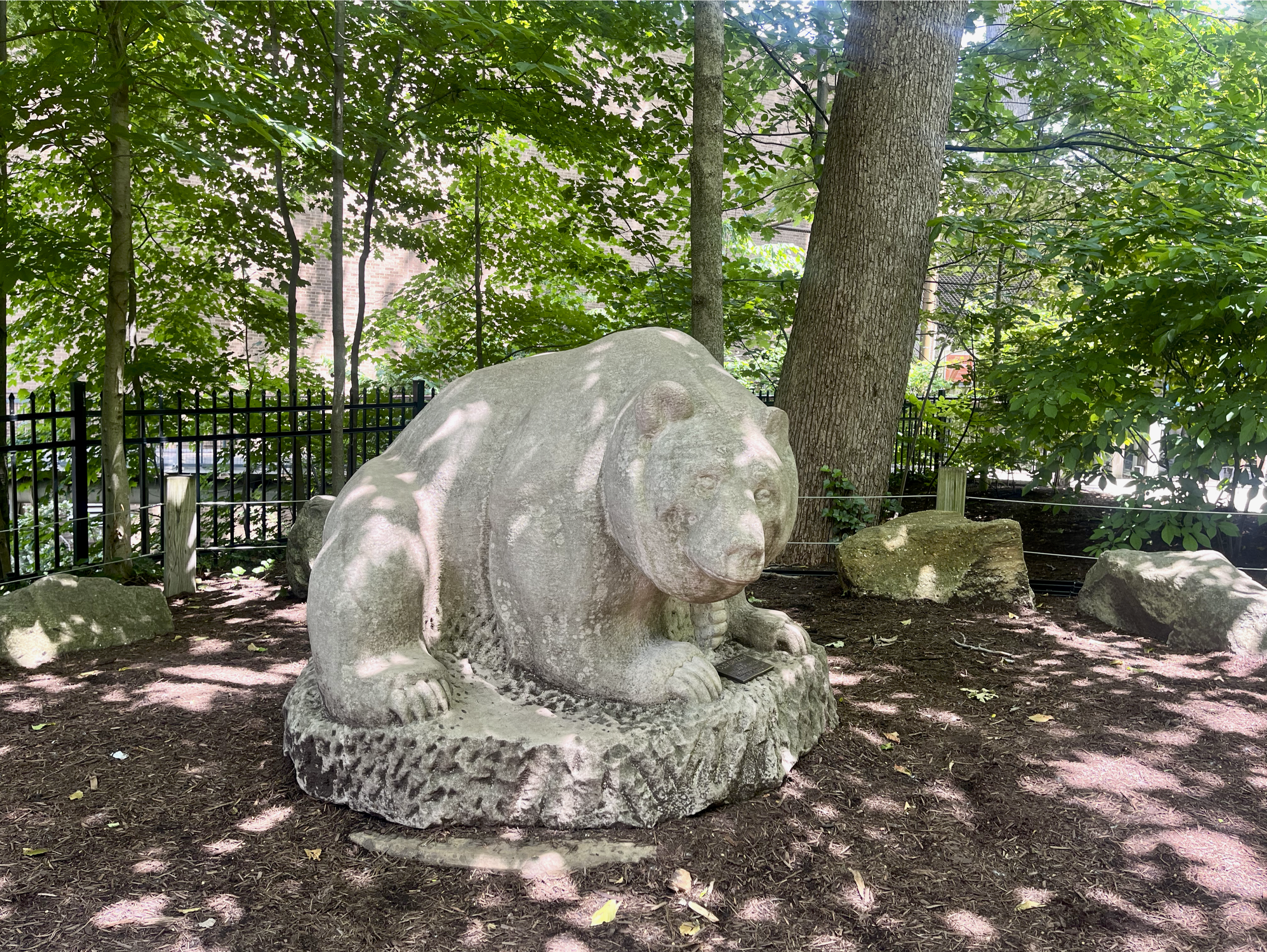
Old Grizzly sculpture located at the Cleveland Museum of Natural History

The museum's collection of art includes:

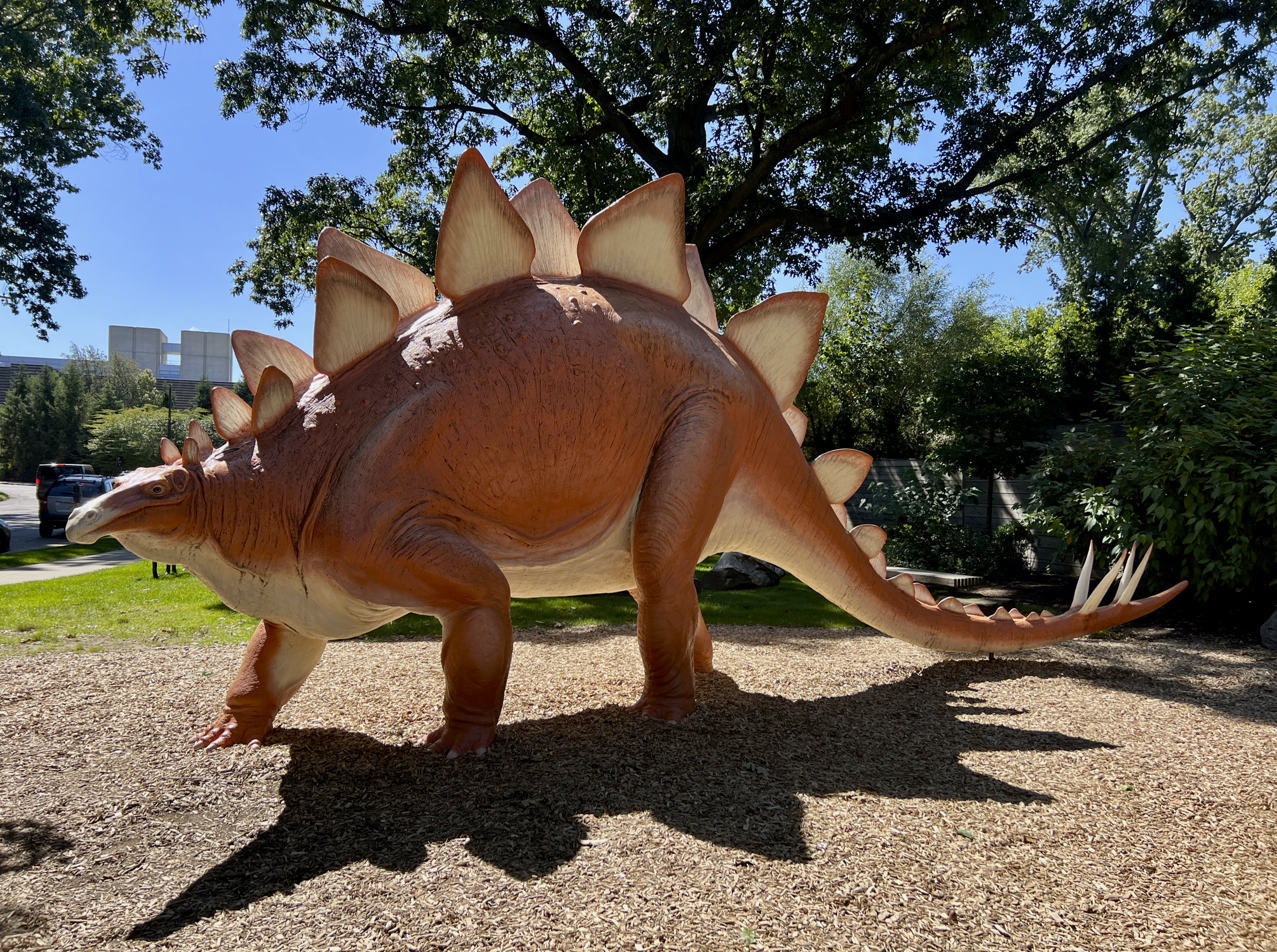
- Steggie sculpture in front of the Cleveland Museum of Natural History
  Steggie, an 18-foot (5.5 m)-long, 8-foot (2.4 m)-tall Stegosaurus sculpture, has greeted museum visitors since 1968. When the original sculpture became worn, a new cast (Steggie II) was made from the original mold by Louis Paul Jonas Studios, the artists who created the first sculpture. In 2016, it was repainted in colors better reflecting current scientific understanding.
- Victor Schreckengost's Pachyderms reliefs are mounted on a wall outside the museum facing the intersection of East Boulevard and Martin Luther King Jr. Drive. The 32-ton terra cotta reliefs depict adult and juvenile mastodons and mammoths, and were originally created in 1955 for the pachyderm house at the Cleveland Metroparks Zoo. When the pachyderm house was demolished for a replacement exhibit in 2008, they were removed and placed in storage. The Intermuseum Conservation Association oversaw their reinstallation at the museum in 2016.
- Old Grizzly, a four-ton limestone bear, was sculpted by William McVey in 1934 through the federal Public Works of Art Project. When the Cleveland Zoo was located in Wade Park, the sculpture was placed near the bear enclosure. It currently sits in the Perkins Wildlife Center.
- An extensive collection of prints in a variety of techniques, including full first-edition sets of Audubon’s Birds of America and later Viviparous Quadrupeds, original ornithological illustrations by Roger Tory Peterson, and stone prints by a selection of contemporary Inuit artists
- A selection of original watercolors by conservationist pioneer Henry Wood Elliott, representing his travels in the Alaskan territory when it was newly acquired from Russia, and his observations of the fur seal trade
- The Hexter Collection of Astronomical and Navigational Objects, a selection of sundials, compasses, and other objects used for the study and measurement of the sky and its movements, produced and finely decorated by European and Persian metal workers and artisans between the 15th and 19th centuries
- Original large-scale paintings representing geological, paleontological, and biological topics commissioned by the Museum from renowned 20th-century illustrator Jay Matternes
- Cast paleontological models created by several early 20th-century sculpture studios, including products by Margaret Flinsch-Buba, Charles R. Knight, and Charles Gilmore
- Original Marchand Studio wax botanical models and paleontological dioramas commissioned by the Museum in the mid-1940s
- Original Paul Jonas Studio biome dioramas commissioned by the Museum in the early 1960s
