= Institute of Science, Nagpur =

Indian university

- Type: Public (Autonomous)
- Established: 1906 (120 years ago)
- Accreditation: NAAC Re-Accredited 'A' Grade, CGPA 3.07
- Affiliations: Rashtrasant Tukadoji Maharaj Nagpur University
- Director: Dr. Anjali Rahatgaonkar
- Academic staff: 64
- Students: 1048
- Location: R. T. Road, Civil Lines, Nagpur, Maharashtra, 440001, India; 21.1465797°N 79.0724039°E
- Campus: 30 acres (12 ha); Urban
- Website: iscnagpur.ac.in

Institute of Science Nagpur (IoS), formerly Government Science Institute, is a government-aided autonomous college located in Nagpur, Maharashtra, India. Established as Victoria College of Science in 1906 during British Raj, it is affiliated to Rashtrasant Tukadoji Maharaj Nagpur University.

== Departments ==
- Physics
- Chemistry
- Mathematics
- Statistics
- Electronics
- Botany
- Zoology
- Computer Science
- Environmental Science

== Accreditation ==
The college is recognized by the University Grants Commission (UGC).
