= Vera Serganova =

American mathematician

Vera Vladimirovna Serganova
- Вера Владимировна Серганова
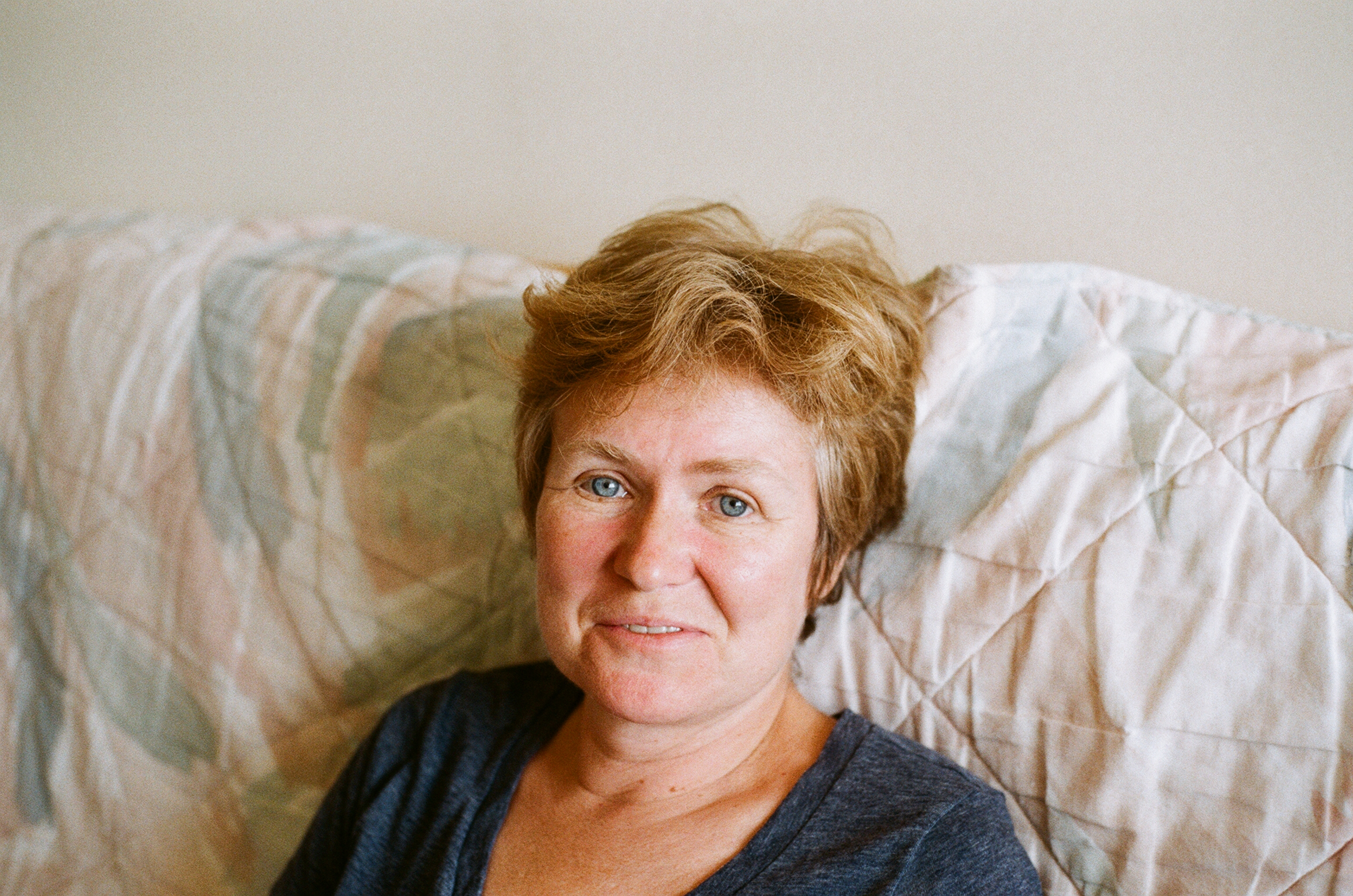
- Serganova in 2011
- Born: 1961
- Known for: Coxeter matroids

Academic background
- Education: Moscow State University; Saint Petersburg State University
- Doctoral advisor: Dimitry Leites and Arkady Lvovich Onishchik

Academic work
- Discipline: Mathematics
- Sub-discipline: Superalgebra
- Institutions: University of California, Berkeley

Vera Vladimirovna Serganova (Russian: Вера Владимировна Серганова) is a professor of mathematics at the University of California, Berkeley who researches superalgebras and their representations.

Serganova graduated from Moscow State School 57 and Moscow State University. She defended her Ph.D. in 1988 at Saint Petersburg State University under the joint supervision of Dimitry Leites and Arkady Onishchik. She was an invited speaker at the International Congress of Mathematicians in 1998 and a plenary speaker at the ICM in 2014. In 2017, she was elected a member of the American Academy of Arts and Sciences.

The Gelfand–Serganova theorem gives a geometric characterization of Coxeter matroids; it was published by Serganova and Israel Gelfand in 1987 as part of their research originating the concept of a Coxeter matroid.
