= H. S. M. Coxeter =

Canadian geometer (1907–2003)

H. S. M. Coxeter CC FRS FRSC
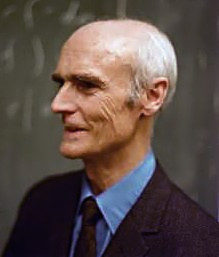
- Coxeter in 1970
- Born: Harold Scott MacDonald Coxeter; 9 February 1907; London, England
- Died: 31 March 2003 (aged 96); Toronto, Ontario, Canada
- Education: University of Cambridge (BA, PhD)
- Known for: Boerdijk–Coxeter helix; Coxeter element; Coxeter functor; Coxeter graph; Coxeter group; Coxeter matroid; Coxeter notation; Coxeter's loxodromic sequence of tangent circles; Coxeter–Dynkin diagram; Coxeter–Todd lattice; Goldberg–Coxeter construction; LCF notation; Petrie–Coxeter polyhedra; Todd–Coxeter algorithm; Tutte–Coxeter graph
- Spouse: Hendrina (died 1999)
- Children: 2
- Awards: Smith's Prize (1931); Henry Marshall Tory Medal (1949); FRS (1950); Jeffery–Williams Prize (1973); CRM-Fields-PIMS prize (1995); Sylvester Medal (1997)
- Scientific career
- Fields: Geometry
- Workplaces: University of Toronto
- Doctoral advisor: H. F. Baker
- Doctoral students: W. G. Brown; Norman Johnson

Harold Scott MacDonald "Donald" Coxeter (/ˈkɒksitər/) (9 February 1907 – 31 March 2003) was a British-Canadian geometer and mathematician. He is regarded as one of the greatest geometers of the 20th century.

Coxeter was born in England and educated at the University of Cambridge, with student visits to Princeton University. He worked for 60 years at the University of Toronto in Canada, from 1936 until his retirement in 1996, becoming a full professor there in 1948. His many honours included membership in the Royal Society of Canada, the Royal Society, and the Order of Canada.

He was an author of 12 books, including The Fifty-Nine Icosahedra (1938) and Regular Polytopes (1947). Many concepts in geometry and group theory are named after him, including the Coxeter graph, Coxeter groups, Coxeter's loxodromic sequence of tangent circles, Coxeter–Dynkin diagrams, and the Todd–Coxeter algorithm.

== Biography ==
Coxeter was born in Kensington, England, to Harold Samuel Coxeter and Lucy (née Gee). His father had taken over the family business of Coxeter & Son, manufacturers of surgical instruments and compressed gases (including a mechanism for anaesthetising surgical patients with nitrous oxide), but was able to retire early and focus on sculpting and baritone singing; Lucy Coxeter was a portrait and landscape painter who had attended the Royal Academy of Arts. A maternal cousin was the architect Sir Giles Gilbert Scott.

In his youth, Coxeter composed music and was an accomplished pianist at the age of 10. He felt that mathematics and music were intimately related, outlining his ideas in a 1962 article on "Music and Mathematics" in the Canadian Music Journal.

He was educated at King Alfred School, London, and then attended St George's School, Harpenden with the goal of becoming a composer, instead deciding he had more interest in mathematics. While recovering from chickenpox at St George's, he met John Flinders Petrie, later a mathematician for whom Petrie polygons were named. He was accepted at King's College, Cambridge, in 1925, but decided to spend a year studying in hopes of gaining admittance to Trinity College, where the standard of mathematics was higher. Coxeter won an entrance scholarship and went to Trinity in 1926 to read mathematics. There he earned his BA (as Senior Wrangler) in 1928, and his doctorate in 1931. In 1932 he went to Princeton University for a year as a Rockefeller Fellow, where he worked with Hermann Weyl, Oswald Veblen, and Solomon Lefschetz. Returning to Trinity for a year, he attended Ludwig Wittgenstein's seminars on the philosophy of mathematics. Wittgenstein selected Coxeter and others to take notes of his lectures, the collection of which later became The Blue Book. In 1934 he spent a further year at Princeton as a Procter Fellow.

In 1936 Coxeter moved to the University of Toronto. In 1938 he and P. Du Val, H. T. Flather, and John Flinders Petrie published The Fifty-Nine Icosahedra with University of Toronto Press. In 1940 Coxeter edited the eleventh edition of Mathematical Recreations and Essays, originally published by W. W. Rouse Ball in 1892. He was elevated to professor in 1948. He was elected a Fellow of the Royal Society of Canada in 1948 and a Fellow of the Royal Society in 1950. He met M. C. Escher in 1954 and the two became lifelong friends; his work on geometric figures helped inspire some of Escher's works, particularly the Circle Limit series based on hyperbolic tessellations. He also inspired some of the innovations of Buckminster Fuller. Coxeter, M. S. Longuet-Higgins and J. C. P. Miller were the first to publish the full list of uniform polyhedra (1954).^{[P54]}

He worked for 60 years at the University of Toronto and published twelve books.

== Personal life ==
Coxeter was a vegetarian. He attributed his longevity to his vegetarian diet, daily exercise such as fifty press-ups and standing on his head for fifteen minutes each morning, and consuming a nightly cocktail made from Kahlúa (a coffee liqueur), peach schnapps, and soy milk.

His wife, Rien died in 1999, after which Coxeter travelled with his daughter, Susan. He died on 31 March 2003, in Toronto.

== Mathematical contributions ==
=== Coxeter group ===
Coxeter invented a group to apply the description of the set of reflections in Euclidean space, hence it is named the Coxeter group.^{[P34]} It is defined as the presentation of a group
$$\left\langle r_1,r_2,\ldots,r_n \mid (r_ir_j)^{m_{ij}}=1\right\rangle$$
where $m_{ii}=1$ and $m_{ij} = m_{ji} \ge 2$ is either an integer or $\infty$ for $i\neq j$. Here, the condition $m_{i j}=\infty$ means that no relation of the form $(r_ir_j)^m = 1$ for any integer $m \ge 2$ should be imposed.

Coxeter–Dynkin diagram for the fundamental finite Coxeter groups

Coxeter classified the finite Coxeter groups in 1935.^{[P35]} These groups were associated with diagrams consisting of dots and segment lines connecting them. These diagrams are known as the Dynkin diagram, named for Soviet–American mathematician Eugene Dynkin, describing the families of finite-dimensional simple Lie algebras of root systems $A_n$, $B_n$, $C_n$, $D_n$, $E_6$, $E_7$, $E_8$, $F_4$, $G_2$, $H_4$, $H_5$, $I_2$. The amalgamation is now known as Coxeter–Dynkin diagram or Coxeter graph. Coxeter denotes these groups and their diagram structures in bracket notations, named as Coxeter notation or Coxeter symbol.

=== Polyhedra and polytopes ===
The book The Fifty-Nine Icosahedra by Coxeter, Patrick du Val, H. T. Flather, and John Flinders Petrie,^{[B73]} published by the University of Toronto in 1938, describes the 59 stellations of a regular icosahedron, made by extending its faces to form a star-shaped solid.

Coxeter's Regular Polytopes was published in numerous editions:^{[B63]} by Methuen in 1947, by Pitman Publishing in 1948, the second edition by Macmillan in 1963, and the third edition by Dover Publications in 1973.

Three regular skew apeirohedra by Petrie and Coxeter: mucube, muoctahedron, and mutetrahedron

English mathematician John Flinders Petrie, in 1926, took the concept of regular skew polygons—where the vertices are not in the same plane—to three-dimensional polyhedra. He found two regular skew apeirohedra, constructed of cubes and truncated octahedra by removing the shared square faces of adjacent polyhedra to form a tunnels. Coxeter discovered the third regular skew polyhedron, constructed of multiple truncated tetrahedra under Petrie's procedure.^{[B68]} Respectively, these polyhedra were later named by English mathematician John Conway as mucube, muoctahedron, and mutetrahedron.

Michael Goldberg introduced the Goldberg polyhedron family, whose faces are pentagons and hexagons. The dual of such a polyhedron is geodesic polyhedron, described as an almost spherical shape with triangular faces, which Buckminster Fuller called "geodesic domes". These polyhedra were extended and applied in Donald Caspar and Aaron Klug's article on the geometry of viral capsids. Coxeter^{[B71]} covered much of the information without referring to biological explanations. Caspar and Klug were the first to publish the most general correct construction of a geodesic polyhedron, making the name "Goldberg–Coxeter construction" an instance of Stigler's law of eponymy.

=== Spirals and helices ===
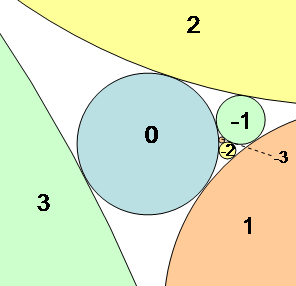
Coxeter's loxodromic sequence of tangent circles

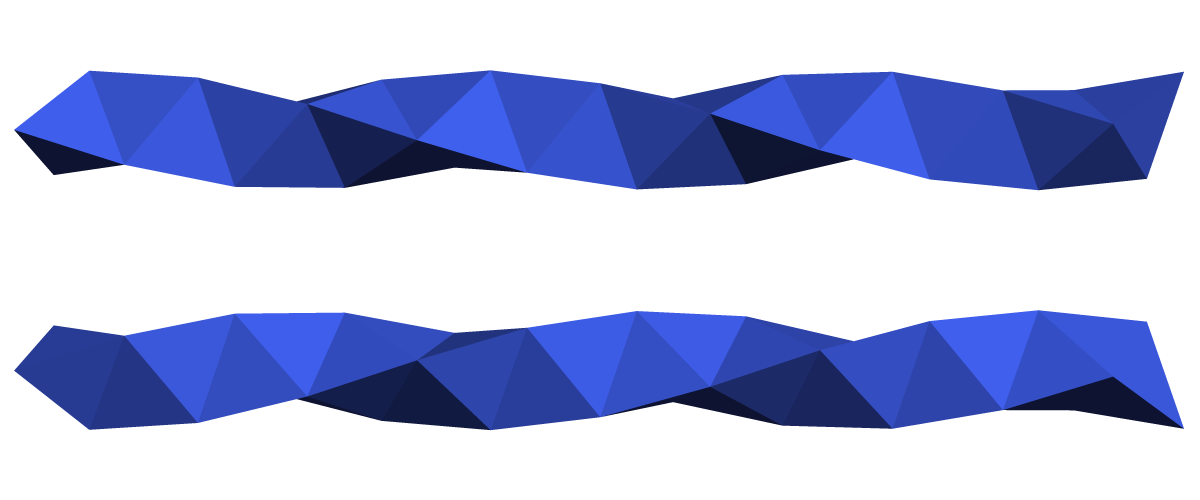
Boerdijk–Coxeter helix

Coxeter studied the infinite circles tangent to each other arranged loxodromically, so that any four consecutive circles in a sequence are pairwise mutually tangent.^{[P68]} This was later generalized to the case of spheres and hyperspheres in higher-dimensional space.^{[P97][P98]}

Coxeter and Arie Hendrick Boerdijk constructed an assemblage of stacked regular tetrahedra linearly, such that the edges form three helices, thereby what is nowadays called Boerdijk–Coxeter helix.^{[P85b][B74b]}

=== Graph theory ===
Coxeter graph

Tutte–Coxeter graph. The LCF notation of this graph is [−13,−9,7,−7,9,13]^{5}

Coxeter in 1983's paper My Graph^{[P83]} showed a 3-regular graph with 28 vertices and 42 edges. A graph with 30 vertices and 45 edges was discovered by William Thomas Tutte, and the study of its connection to geometric configurations was investigated by Tutte and Coxeter,^{[P58]} now known as Tutte–Coxeter graph.

Coxeter, along with Robert Frucht, extended LCF notation devised by Joshua Lederberg for the representation of cubic graphs that contain a Hamiltonian cycle.^{[B81]}

== Awards ==
Since 1978, the Canadian Mathematical Society has awarded the Coxeter–James Prize in his honor.

He was made a Fellow of the Royal Society in 1950 and in 1997 he was awarded their Sylvester Medal. In 1990, he became a Foreign Member of the American Academy of Arts and Sciences and in 1997 was made a Companion of the Order of Canada.

In 1973 he received the Jeffery–Williams Prize.

A festschrift in his honour, The Geometric Vein, was published in 1982. It contained 41 essays on geometry, based on a symposium for Coxeter held at Toronto in 1979. A second such volume, The Coxeter Legacy, was published in 2006 based on a Toronto Coxeter symposium held in 2004.

== Works ==
Coxeter published twelve books, and over 200 articles:

=== Books ===
| B42. | Coxeter, Harold Scott MacDonald (1942). Non-Euclidean Geometry (1st ed.). Cambridge University Press., (2nd ed, 1947), (3rd ed, 1957), (4th ed, 1961), (5th ed, 1965), University of Toronto Press (6th ed, 1998), MAA, ISBN 978-0-88385-522-5. |

| B49. | Coxeter, Harold Scott MacDonald (1949). The Real Projective Plane. |

| B61. | Coxeter, Harold Scott MacDonald (1961). Introduction to Geometry. (2nd paperback edition 1989, ISBN 978-0-471-50458-0.) |

| B63. | Coxeter, Harold Scott MacDonald (1963). Regular Polytopes (2nd ed.). Macmillan Company. |

| B67. | Coxeter, Harold Scott MacDonald; Greitzer, S.L. (1967). Geometry Revisited. |

| B68. | Coxeter, Harold Scott MacDonald (1968). The Beauty of Geometry: Twelve Essays. Southern Illinois University Press. |

| B70. | Coxeter, Harold Scott MacDonald (1970). Twisted honeycombs. American Mathematical Society, Regional conference series in mathematics Number 4. ISBN 0-8218-1653-5. |

| B71. | Coxeter, Harold Scott MacDonald (1971). "Virus macromolecules and geodesic domes". In Butcher, J.C. (ed.). A spectrum of mathematics. Oxford University Press, Auckland University Press. pp. 98–107. |

| B73. | Coxeter, Harold Scott MacDonald (1973). Regular Polytopes (3rd ed.). Dover. ISBN 0-486-61480-8. |

| B74a. | Coxeter, Harold Scott MacDonald (1974). Projective Geometry (2nd ed.). |

| B74b. | Coxeter, Harold Scott MacDonald (1974). Regular Complex Polytopes. Cambridge University Press. ISBN 978-0-521-20125-4. |

| B80. | Coxeter, Harold Scott MacDonald; Moser, W. O. J. (1957). Generators and Relations for Discrete Groups. 1980: Second edition, Springer-Verlag ISBN 0-387-09212-9 |

| B81. | Coxeter, Harold Scott MacDonald; Frucht, R.; Powers, D. L. (1981). Zero-Symmetric Graphs. Academic Press. ISBN 978-0-12-194580-0. |

| B87. | Coxeter, Harold Scott MacDonald (1987). Projective Geometry. Springer. ISBN 978-0-387-40623-7. |

| B94. | Sherk, F. Arthur; McMullen, Peter; Thompson, Anthony C.; Weiss, Asia Ivić (1995). Kaleidoscopes — Selected Writings of H. S. M. Coxeter. John Wiley and Sons. ISBN 0-471-01003-0. |

| B11. | Coxeter, Harold Scott MacDonald (2011). The Fifty-Nine Icosahedra. Tarquin Group. ISBN 978-1-907550-08-9. |

=== Selected papers ===
| P34. | Coxeter, H. S. M. (1934). "Discrete groups generated by reflections". Annals of Mathematics. 35 (3): 588–621. doi:10.2307/1968753. JSTOR 1968753. |

| P35. | Coxeter, H. S. M. (January 1935). "The complete enumeration of finite groups of the form $r_{i}^{2}=(r_{i}r_{j})^{k_{ij}}=1$". Journal of the London Mathematical Society: 21–25. doi:10.1112/jlms/s1-10.37.21. |

| P40. | Coxeter, Harold Scott MacDonald (1940). "Regular and Semi-Regular Polytopes I". Mathematische Zeitschrift. 46: 380–407. doi:10.1007/BF01181449. |

| P54. | Coxeter, Harold Scott MacDonald; Longuet-Higgins, Michael S.; Miller, J.C.P. (1954). "Uniform Polyhedra". Philosophical Transactions of the Royal Society A. 246 (916): 401–450. Bibcode:1954RSPTA.246..401C. doi:10.1098/rsta.1954.0003. |

| P58. | Coxeter, Harold Scott MacDonald (1958a). "The chords of the non-ruled quadric in PG(3,3)". Canadian Journal of Mathematics. 10: 484–488. doi:10.4153/CJM-1958-047-0. |

| P68. | Coxeter, H. S. M. (1968). "Loxodromic sequences of tangent spheres". Aequationes Mathematicae. 1 (1–2): 104–121. doi:10.1007/BF01817563. MR 0235456. S2CID 119897862. |

| P71. | Coxeter, H. (1971). "Frieze patterns" (PDF). Acta Arithmetica. 18: 297–310. doi:10.4064/aa-18-1-297-310. ISSN 0065-1036. |

| P83. | Coxeter, Harold Scott MacDonald (1983). "My Graph". Proceedings of the London Mathematical Society. 46: 117–136. |

| P85a. | Coxeter, Harold Scott MacDonald (1985). "Regular and Semi-Regular Polytopes II". Mathematische Zeitschrift. 188 (4): 559–591. doi:10.1007/BF01161657. |

| P85b. | Coxeter, Harold Scott MacDonald (1985). "The Simplicial Helix and the Equation $\tan n\theta = n \tan \theta$". Canadian Mathematical Bulletin. 28 (4): 385–393. doi:10.4153/CMB-1985-045-5. |

| P88. | Coxeter, Harold Scott MacDonald (1988). "Regular and Semi-Regular Polytopes III". Mathematische Zeitschrift. 200: 3–45. doi:10.1007/BF01161745. |

| P97. | Coxeter, H. S. M. (1997). "Numerical distances among the spheres in a loxodromic sequence". The Mathematical Intelligencer. 19 (4): 41–47. doi:10.1007/BF03024413. MR 1488865. S2CID 120436625. |

| P98. | Coxeter, H. S. M. (1998). "Numerical distances among the circles in a loxodromic sequence". Nieuw Archief voor Wiskunde. 16 (1–2): 1–9. MR 1645232. |

== See also ==
- Coxeter–James Prize
- Spiral similarity
