= Arkady Onishchik =

Soviet and Russian mathematician (1933–2019)

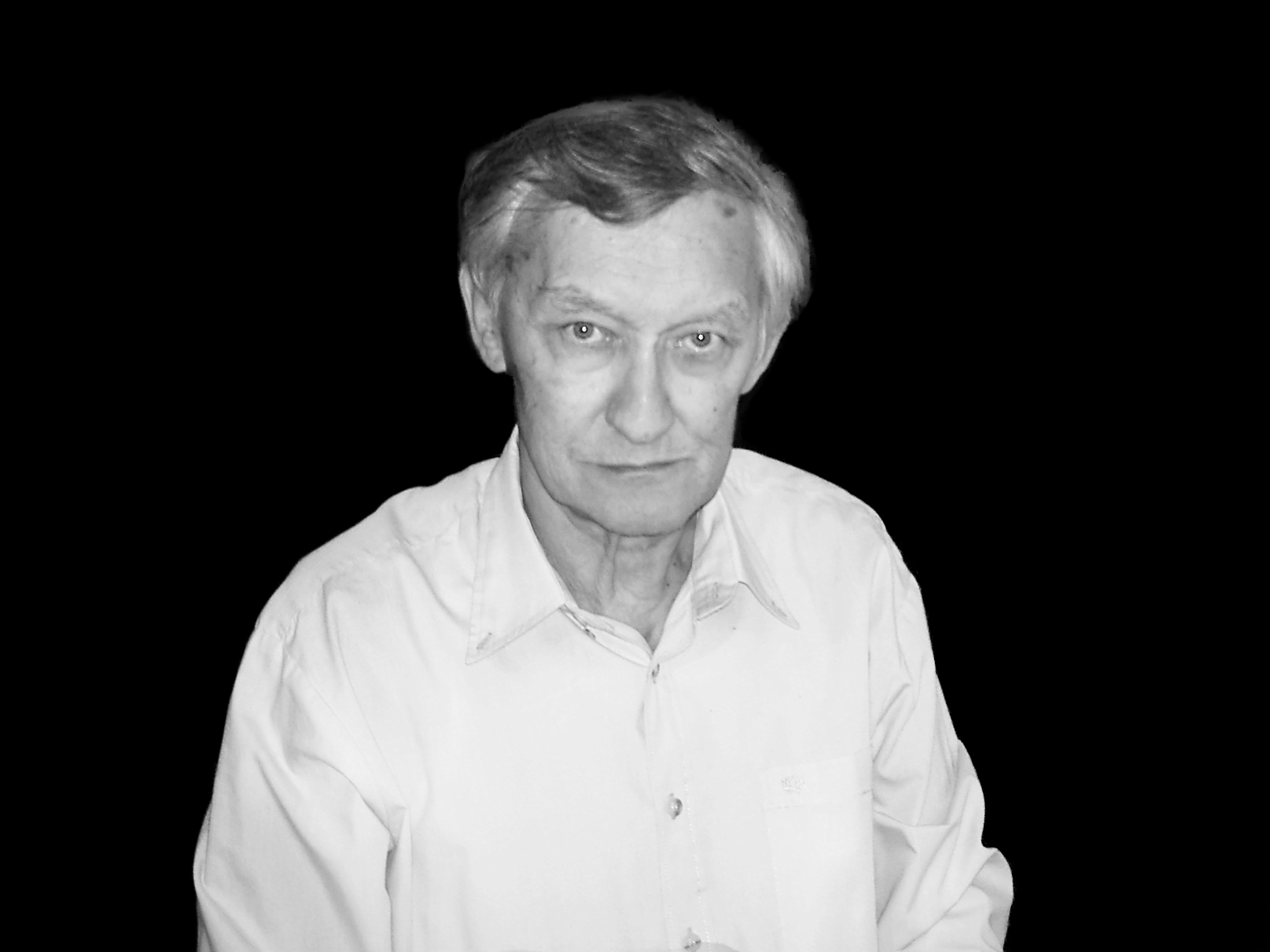
- Born: Arkady L'vovich Onishchik; 14 November 1933; Moscow, Russian Federation, Soviet Union
- Died: 12 February 2019 (aged 85); Moscow, Russia
- Education: Moscow State University
- Known for: Matsushima–Onishchik Theorem
- Awards: Moscow Mathematical Society Prize (1962)
- Scientific career
- Fields: Mathematics
- Workplaces: Moscow State University; Yaroslavl State University
- Doctoral advisor: Eugene Dynkin
- Doctoral students: Mikhail Borovoi; Vera Serganova

Arkady L'vovich Onishchik (Russian: Арка́дий Льво́вич Они́щик, born 14 November 1933 in Moscow; died 12 February 2019) was a prominent Soviet and Russian mathematician, who worked on Lie groups and their geometrical applications. Onishchik was a student of Eugene Dynkin, under whose guidance he got his PhD at Moscow State University in 1960. In 1962 Onishchik received the Prize of the Moscow Mathematical Society for young mathematicians. In 1970 he got Habilitation (Russian title of Doctor of Sciences). Since 1975 Onishchik was a professor of Yaroslavl State University.

Onishchik introduced new homotopy invariants of homogeneous spaces and classified factorizations of connected simple compact Lie groups into the product of two connected Lie subgroups. In complex analysis, the Matsushima–Onishchik theorem describes homogeneous spaces of complex reductive groups that are Stein manifolds. In addition to Lie groups and algebras, Onishchik also worked on nonabelian cohomology and on supermanifolds.

== Books ==
- with E. B. Vinberg: Lie groups and algebraic groups, Springer-Verlag 1990.
- Topology of transitive transformations groups. Barth, Leipzig 1994.
- with E. B. Vinberg: (Eds.): Lie groups and Lie algebras. 3 volumes. Encyclopaedia of Mathematical Sciences, Springer-Verlag, of which by him:
  - with E. B. Vinberg: Foundations of Lie theory, in Vol. 1, 1997.
  - with V. V. Gorbatsevich: Lie transformation theory, in Vol. 1.
  - with V. V. Gorbatsevich and E. B. Vinberg: Structure of Lie groups and Lie algebras, in Vol. 3, 1994.
- Lectures on real semisimple Lie algebras and their representations. European Mathematical Society, Zürich 2004.
- with Rolf Sulanke: Projective and Cayley-Klein Geometries. Springer-Verlag, 2006.
