= Geometry Revisited =

Book 1967

Geometry Revisited is a geometry book written by H. S. M. Coxeter and S. L. Greitzer. The works cited in the bibliography of the book include those written by Walter William Rouse Ball, Eric Temple Bell, Nathan Altshiller Court, Clement Vavasor Durell, László Fejes Tóth, Henry George Forder, Godfrey Harold Hardy, Roger Arthur Johnson, Nicholas Donat Kazarinoff, Horace Lamb, Edward Harrington Lockwood, Thomas Hay O'Beirne, Øystein Ore, Daniel Pedoe, Hazel Perfect, Julius Petersen, Vladimir Grigorievich Shervatov, Aleksandr Stepanovich Smogorzhevskii, Bartel Leendert van der Waerden and Isaak Moiseevich Yaglom.
