= Mikhail Borovoi =

Mathematician

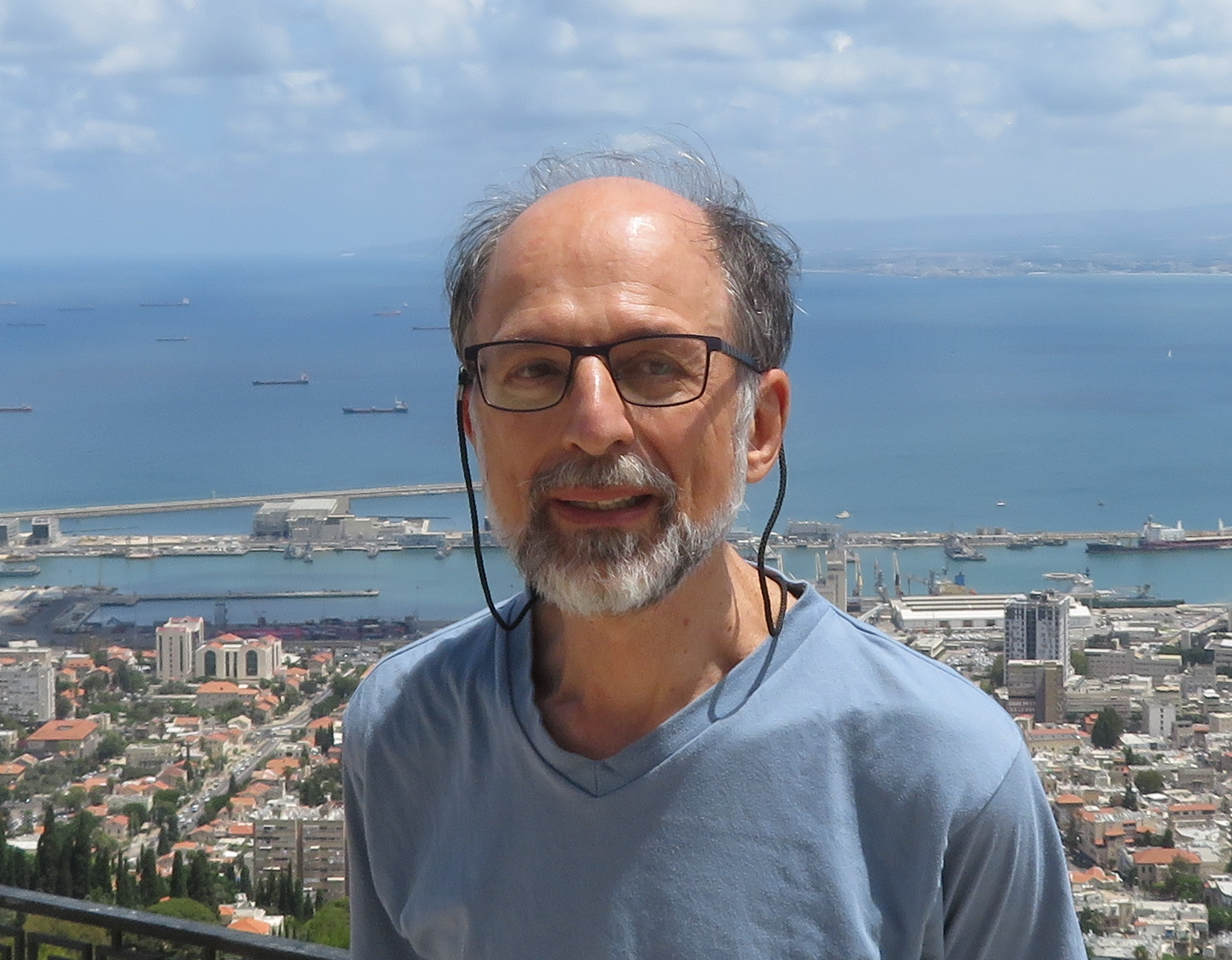

Mikhail Vol'fovich Borovoi (Russian: Михаи́л Во́льфович Борово́й, Hebrew: מיכאל בורובוי; born February 17, 1951) is a Soviet and Israeli mathematician. He has worked on Galois cohomology and on the arithmetic of linear algebraic groups, homogeneous spaces, Shimura varieties, and spherical varieties.

== Education and career ==
Borovoi was born in Moscow. He obtained his diploma (M.Sc.) in Mathematics at Lomonosov Moscow State University, and his Ph.D. at the Leningrad Department (now: St. Petersburg Department) of the Steklov Institute of Mathematics in 1980; his doctoral advisor was Arkady L. Onishchik. Because of Antisemitism in the Soviet Union of the time, Borovoi could not find a job as a mathematician, and only with the start of Perestroika, in 1987 he got a position of a Senior Researcher at the Khabarovsk Division of the Institute for Applied Mathematics of the Far Eastern Branch of the USSR Academy of Sciences in the Far Eastern city of Khabarovsk. He spent the 1990-1991 academic year at the Institute for Advanced Study. Since 1992 he has been at Tel Aviv University, where now he is Professor Emeritus.

== Research ==
Borovoi is known for the Borovoi fundamental group of a reductive group. Jointly with James S. Milne, Borovoi proved Shimura's conjecture in the theory of Shimura varieties, which was the subject of Borovoi's invited talk at the International Congress of Mathematicians, Berkeley, 1986. He proved that the Brauer-Manin obstruction is the only obstruction to the Hasse principle and weak approximation for homogeneous spaces of connected linear algebraic groups over number fields with connected geometric stabilizers. Jointly with Cyril Demarche, he proved a similar result for the Brauer-Manin obstruction to strong approximation
