= Regular Polytopes (book) =

Geometry book

- Cover of the Dover edition, 1973
- Author: Harold Scott MacDonald Coxeter
- Language: English
- Subject: Geometry
- Published: 1947, 1963, 1973
- Publisher: Methuen, Pitman, Macmillan, Dover
- Pages: 321
- ISBN: 0-486-61480-8
- OCLC: 798003

Regular Polytopes is a geometry book on regular polytopes written by Harold Scott MacDonald Coxeter. It was originally published by Methuen in 1947 and by Pitman Publishing in 1948, with a second edition published by Macmillan in 1963 and a third edition by Dover Publications in 1973. The Basic Library List Committee of the Mathematical Association of America has recommended that it be included in undergraduate mathematics libraries.

== Overview ==
The main topics of the book are the Platonic solids (regular convex polyhedra), related polyhedra, and their higher-dimensional generalizations. It has 14 chapters, along with multiple appendices, providing a more complete treatment of the subject than any earlier work, and incorporating material from 18 of Coxeter's own previous papers. It includes many figures (both photographs of models by Paul Donchian and drawings), tables of numerical values, and historical remarks on the subject.

The first chapter discusses regular polygons, regular polyhedra, basic concepts of graph theory, and the Euler characteristic. Using the Euler characteristic, Coxeter derives a Diophantine equation whose integer solutions describe and classify the regular polyhedra. The second chapter uses combinations of regular polyhedra and their duals to generate related polyhedra, including the semiregular polyhedra, and discusses zonohedra and Petrie polygons. Here and throughout the book, the shapes it discusses are identified and classified by their Schläfli symbols.

Chapters 3 through 5 describe the symmetries of polyhedra, first as permutation groups and later, in the most innovative part of the book, as the Coxeter groups, groups generated by reflections and described by the angles between their reflection planes. This part of the book also describes the regular tessellations of the Euclidean plane and the sphere, and the regular honeycombs of Euclidean space. Chapter 6 discusses the star polyhedra including the Kepler–Poinsot polyhedra.

The remaining chapters cover higher-dimensional generalizations of these topics, including two chapters on the enumeration and construction of the regular polytopes, two chapters on higher-dimensional Euler characteristics and background on quadratic forms, two chapters on higher-dimensional Coxeter groups, a chapter on cross-sections and projections of polytopes, and a chapter on star polytopes and polytope compounds.

== Later editions ==
The second edition was published in paperback; it adds some more recent research of Robert Steinberg on Petrie polygons and the order of Coxeter groups, appends a new definition of polytopes at the end of the book, and makes minor corrections throughout. The photographic plates were also enlarged for this printing, and some figures were redrawn. The nomenclature of these editions was occasionally cumbersome, and was modernized in the third edition. The third edition also included a new preface with added material on polyhedra in nature, found by the electron microscope.

== Reception ==
The book only assumes a high-school understanding of algebra, geometry, and trigonometry, but it is primarily aimed at professionals in this area, and some steps in the book's reasoning which a professional could take for granted might be too much for less-advanced readers. Nevertheless, reviewer J. C. P. Miller recommends it to "anyone interested in the subject, whether from recreational, educational, or other aspects", and (despite complaining about the omission of regular skew polyhedra) reviewer H. E. Wolfe suggests more strongly that every mathematician should own a copy. Geologist A. J. Frueh Jr., describing the book as a textbook rather than a monograph, suggests that the parts of the book on the symmetries of space would likely be of great interest to crystallographers; however, Frueh complains of the lack of rigor in its proofs and the lack of clarity in its descriptions.

Already in its first edition the book was described as "long awaited", and "what is, and what will probably be for many years, the only organized treatment of the subject". In a review of the second edition, Michael Goldberg (who also reviewed the first edition) called it "the most extensive and authoritative summary" of its area of mathematics. By the time of Tricia Muldoon Brown's 2016 review, she described it as "occasionally out-of-date, although not frustratingly so", for instance in its discussion of the four color theorem, proved after its last update. However, she still evaluated it as "well-written and comprehensive".

== See also ==
- List of books about polyhedra
