= Hilda Petrie =

British egyptologist (1871–1957)

Hilda, Lady Petrie
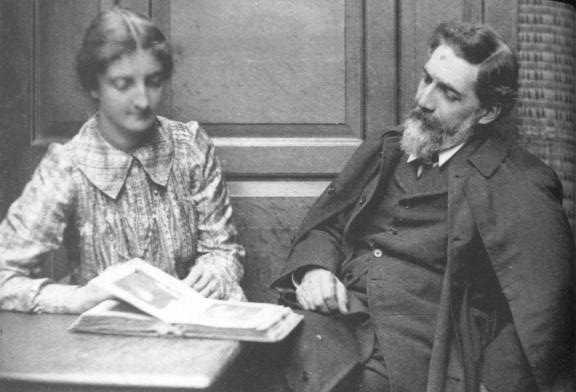
- Hilda and Flinders Petrie, 1903.
- Born: 1871; Dublin, Ireland
- Died: 1957 (aged 85–86); London, England
- Spouse: Sir Flinders Petrie

Hilda Mary Isabel, Lady Petrie (née Urlin; 1871–1957), was an Irish-born British Egyptologist and wife of Sir Flinders Petrie, the father of scientific archaeology. Having studied geology, she was hired by Flinders Petrie at age 25 as an artist, which led to their marriage and a working partnership that endured for their lifetimes.

Hilda travelled and worked with Sir Flinders Petrie to excavate and record numerous sites in Egypt, and later in Palestine. This included directing some excavations herself, and working in often difficult and dangerous conditions to produce copies of tomb hieroglyphs and plans, and to record the work for reports to the Egypt Exploration Fund. When the British School of Archaeology in Egypt was founded in 1905 in London by Flinders Petrie, she worked as its secretary and fundraiser to secure support for the school and their continued excavations. Hilda took part in archaeological excavations and surveys throughout her married life, except for a period while their two children were young. Her work was published, and she also gave public lectures in London and elsewhere.

== Education and family life ==
Hilda Mary Isabel Urlin was born in Dublin in 1871, the youngest of five daughters of an English couple long resident in Ireland, (Richard) Denny Urlin and Mary Elizabeth (née Addis) Urlin. When Hilda was four years old, her family moved back to London and she was educated by a governess along with other children of similar age. As she grew older she often went on bicycling expeditions with her friend Beatrice Orme. Together, they explored the countryside, visiting and sketching ancient churches, and making brass rubbings. Another of her childhood friends was Philippa Fawcett whose mother, Dame Millicent Fawcett, was a leader in the women's suffrage movement. Philippa later went to Cambridge to read mathematics and was to become the first woman Senior Wrangler.

Petrie preferred the country life and initially disliked London, but as she grew older she enjoyed visiting its museums and art galleries. During her teens she was regarded as an attractive red-headed girl and she sat for the painter Henry Holiday at his studio in Hampstead, modelling for the figure of a young girl in two of his much-exhibited paintings. She studied at King's College for Women, where she took Professor Seeley's geology course, and would go on field trips equipped with a notebook and hammer. She also took courses in facsimile drawing, for which she displayed a considerable talent.

When she was twenty-five, she was introduced by Henry Holiday to Egyptology Professor Flinders Petrie at University College London, who needed to employ someone with the accurate copying skills Hilda had by then acquired. This introduction led to their marriage on 26 November 1896, with the couple leaving for Egypt the following day.

The Petries had two children, John (1907–1972) and Ann (1909–1989), and lived in Hampstead, where an English Heritage blue plaque now stands at 5 Cannon Place, where they lived. Their son was John Flinders Petrie, the mathematician, who gave his name to the Petrie polygon. In 1957, Lady Petrie died of a stroke in University College Hospital, on the opposite side of the road to where she and her husband had worked to found and to fund what was England's first training school for archaeologists.

== Archaeological career ==
=== Egypt ===
Hilda left for Egypt for the first time on 25 November 1896, and was thereafter to accompany her husband into the field every year except for a period when their son and daughter were young.

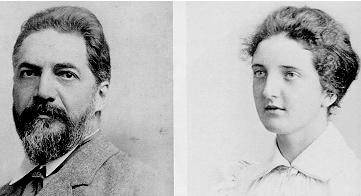
Petrie and Urlin in 1897

After a few days spent at Cairo, and including a visit to Giza, the Petries travelled to Upper Egypt as part of an expedition to dig on behalf of the Egypt Exploration Fund in the cemetery area behind the temple of Dendera, 70 km north of Luxor.

During this expedition, Hilda worked in the deep shafts of the tombs that were being excavated, climbing down a rope ladder to copy the scenes and inscriptions found deep underground. One large sarcophagus had some 20,000 hieroglyphs to record, and Hilda spent days lying on the ground to copy them. Her record work also included drawing the profiles of the pots, beads, scarabs and other small finds of the excavation, and sometimes writing the daily journal that was sent weekly to report progress to the Committee, and assisting Flinders Petrie to write the excavation reports. Her role did not include running the domestic side of the expedition, which was undertaken by Flinders Petrie as it had been done for many years, with excavators expected to live on canned food and ship's biscuits.

In the 1898 excavation of the cemetery sites of Abadiyeh and Hu, Hilda helped to survey the site. She used the Naqada plates to identify the shape of pots, slates and flints and, once Flinders had entered these finds onto the plan, Hilda was responsible for writing on each find the number of the grave in which it had been found. Her work was noted by Flinders Petrie in the introduction to the excavation report of that year: "My wife was with me all the time, helping in the surveying, cataloguing, and marking of the objects, and also drawing all the tomb plans here published." Her work at the site continued into 1898–9, and she drew almost all of the pottery marks and arranged the plates, as well as undertaking the continual work to register and attend to the pottery, and to number the skeletons. A plan of a fort was made at this time by both Petries.

In the winter of 1902, the last season spent excavating at Abydos, Hilda was given control of an excavation of her own. The team comprised Margaret Murray, and Miss Hansard, an artist, as well as Hilda, and attempted a difficult and hazardous excavation after the discovery the previous year of what appeared to be the approach to a huge underground tomb discovered in an area at the back of the temple of Seti I. The deep excavation was in constant danger of caving in and, when the wind blew, loose sand and shifting stone blocks threatened the workers below; the work was ultimately abandoned. The report of that year to the Egypt Exploration fund sums up Hilda Petrie's contributions to the work thus:

“My wife was closely occupied with drawing nearly all of the season; especially on the tedious figuring of nearly 400 flints, and the exact facsimile copies of inscriptions.”

In 1904, Hilda Petrie was involved in the work at Ehnasya, contributing almost half of the plates of the resultant volume, and visiting Buto. The following year she remained at Saqqara to copy reliefs in some of the Old Kingdom Tombs, as Margaret Murray had the year before. She went from Saqqara to join Flinders Petrie and Lina Eckenstein at a temple site on a hilltop at Serabit el-Khadim, where there were large numbers of inscribed stones, statues and stelae. Some of these were in a hitherto unknown script, which was dubbed Sinaitic, and her work as a copyist was welcomed. Hilda and the 48 year old polymath Lina Eckenstein took a journey across Sinai accompanied by a single guide. Eckenstein was to write several books about her time in Sinai.

=== Work at the British School of Archaeology in Egypt ===
When the British School of Archaeology in Egypt was founded in 1905 in London by Flinders Petrie, Hilda worked there as a secretary to raise funds and recruit new subscribers, and it was during this time that both her children were born. In particular she wrote to the prominent and the wealthy to canvass support for Flinders Petrie's work, and oversaw its publication, and gave public lectures in London and elsewhere in the UK.

=== Further work in Egypt ===
She left for Egypt again in January 1913 to rejoin Flinders Petrie at Kafr Ammar; three painted Twelfth Dynasty tombs had been found a few miles away at Riqqeh and urgently needed recording. The work was again difficult and dangerous, but it was possible and she published a chapter within the final report about the tombs and including her plans and her copies of the wall paintings and coffins.

=== During the First World War ===
When war broke out in 1914, Hilda turned her attention to several women's organisations, including using her fundraising expertise as Honorary Secretary of the Scottish Women's Hospitals, which maintained hospital services for the Serbian division of the Russian army; she was later awarded the Serbian order of St Sava. The Petries also at this time surveyed prehistoric carvings cut in the Downland chalk in the UK.

In 1919 Hilda and Flinders resumed excavations in Egypt, and in the season of 1921, Hilda excavated a Coptic hermit's cell in the Western hills at Abydos, with her plans and drawings of the cave being published in the excavation report for that year, along with her description of the cave and its painted decorations.

=== Excavations around Palestine and Jerusalem ===
The focus of the Petries' excavations shifted in 1926 to the frontier fortresses in Palestine, following the restrictions placed on excavating bodies in Egypt and the exportations of antiquities after the discovery of Tutankhamun's tomb in 1922. Hilda arrived in Gaza on 26 November 1926, where she supervised, registered, and paid the excavation workers, although she spent most of the next three years in England seeking to raise funds for the work, which, unfortunately, did not have the same appeal to her supporters as had the work in Egypt.

The last of the Petries' excavation seasons in Gaza was in 1931 with the huge mound called Tell el Ajull anticipated to furnish work for some years. However, this was not to be and tensions over the excavations caused their excavation work to cease.

By 1933 the Petries had moved to Jerusalem where, for two seasons between 1935 and 1937, they excavated the mound of Sheikh Zoweyd, which had been a frontier fortress between Egypt and Asia. A planned excavation in 1939 was called off when bandits attacked and looted their camp.

=== Second World War onwards: editing and final publications ===
Flinders Petrie died on 29 July 1942, and Hilda Petrie saw out the rest of the war living at the American School of Palestine while editing his papers, which she had determined to send to the newly formed library of the Department of Antiquities at Khartoum.

In 1947 Hilda returned to Hampstead, England where she wound up the affairs of the British School and was in 1952 at last able to publish the tomb reliefs that she had copied in 1905 at Saqqara, before her death in 1957.

== Published works ==
- Egyptian Hieroglyphs of the first and second dynasties, drawn by Hilda Petrie, Quaritch, London 1927
- Seven Memphite tomb chapels, Inscriptions by Margaret A[lice] Murray. Drawings by F. Hansard, F. Kingsford, and L. Eckenstein. Drawings and plans by H. F. Petrie, British School of Egyptian Archaeology and Quaritch, London 1952
- Side Notes on the Bible: From Flinders Petrie's Discoveries, Search Publishing Company Limited, London 1933.

== Literature ==
- Morris L. Bierbrier: Who was Who in Egyptology. 3. Auflage, London 1995, S. 329 (mit Verzeichnis der Nachrufe).
- Margaret S. Drower: Flinders Petrie: a life in archaeology. Victor Gollancz, London 1984, S. 231–248.
- Margaret S. Drower: Hilda Mary Isabel Petrie. In: Breaking Grounds. Women in Old World Archaeology (mit Schriftenverzeichnis; PDF; 408 kB)
- Margaret S. Drower: Letters from the Desert – the Correspondence of Flinders and Hilda Petrie. Aris & Philips, London 2004 ISBN 0-85668-748-0.
- Andrea Rottloff: Die Berühmten Archäologen Bd. 1). von Zabern, Mainz 2009, ISBN 978-3-8053-4063-2, S. 77–82.
