= John Flinders Petrie =

Developer of the Petrie polygon

- Died: 1972
- Known for: Petrie polygon

John Flinders Petrie (26 April 1907 – 1972) was an English mathematician. Petrie was the great grandson of the explorer and navigator, Matthew Flinders. He met the geometer Harold Scott MacDonald Coxeter as a student, beginning a lifelong friendship. They collaborated in discovering infinite warped polyhedra and (finite) warped polyhedra in the fourth dimension, analogous to the previous ones. In addition to being the first to realize the importance of the warped polygon that now bears his name, he was also skilled as a draftsperson.

== Biography ==
Petrie was born on 26 April 1907, in Hampstead, London. He was the only son of the renowned Egyptologists Sir William Matthew Flinders Petrie (and through him the great grandson of the explorer and navigator Matthew Flinders) and Hilda Petrie. While studying at a boarding school, he met Coxeter in a sanatorium while recovering from a minor illness, beginning a friendship that would remain throughout their lives. Looking at a geometry textbook with an appendix on Platonic polyhedra, they wondered why there were only five and tried to increase their number. Petrie commented: How about we put four squares around one corner? In practice, they would lie on a plane, forming a pattern of squares covering the plane. He called this arrangement a "tesserohedron", reaching the similar structure of triangles a "trigonohedron."

== Polyhedral regular tilings ==
In 1926, Petrie told Coxeter that he had discovered two new regular polyhedra, infinite but free of "false vertices" (points distinct from the vertices, where three or more faces meet, like those that characterize regular star polyhedra): one consisting of squares, six at each vertex and another consisting of hexagons, four at each vertex, which form a dual or reciprocal pair. To the common objection that there is no room for more than four squares around a vertex, he revealed the trick: allow the faces to be arranged up and down, marking a zigzag. When Coxeter understood this, he mentioned a third possibility: hexagons, six around a vertex, its dual.

Coxeter suggested a modified Schläfli symbol, {l, m | n} for these figures, with the emblem {l, m} implying the vertex figure, m l-gons around a vertex and n-gonal holes. Then it occurred to them that, although the new polyhedra are infinite, they could find analogous finite polyhedra by delving into the fourth dimension. Petrie cited one consisting of n2 squares, four at each vertex. They called these figures "regular skew polyhedra". Later, Coxeter would delve deeper into the subject.

== University and work ==
Because his father belonged to University College London, Petrie enrolled in this institution, where he successfully completed his studies. When the Second World War broke out, he enlisted as an officer and was captured as a prisoner by the Germans, organizing a choir during his captivity. After the war ended and he was released, he went to Darlington Hall, a school in southwest England. He worked many years as a schoolteacher. He was one of the tutors who attended to the children doing poorly in school.

== The Petrie polygon ==
Petrie continued to correspond with Coxeter and was the first to notice that, among the edges of a regular polyhedron, a skew polygon forming a zigzag can be distinguished, in which the first and second are the edges of one face, the second and third are the edges of another face and so on, successively. This zigzag is known as the "Petrie polygon" and has many applications. The Petrie polygon of a regular polyhedron can be defined as the skew polygon (whose vertices do not all lie in the same plane) such that every two consecutive sides (but not three) belong to one of the faces of the polyhedron.

Each finite regular polyhedron can be orthogonally projected onto a plane so that the Petrie polygon becomes a regular polygon, with the rest of the projection inside. These polygons and their projected graphs help visualize the symmetrical structure of regular polytopes of higher dimensions, which are difficult to conceive or imagine without this aid.

His skills as a draftsman are shown in an exquisite set of drawings of the stellated icosahedron, which provides much of the fascination of the much-discussed book he illustrates. On another occasion, to explain the symmetry of the icosahedron, Coxeter showed an orthogonal projection, representing 10 of the 15 great circles as ellipses. The difficult task of drawing was performed by Petrie around 1932. It now prominently features on the cover of a popular recreational mathematics book garnished with a touch of colour. It is reported that, in periods of intense concentration, he could answer questions about complex figures of the fourth dimension by "visualizing" them.

== Final years ==
Petrie got married and had a daughter. In late 1972, his wife suffered a sudden heart attack and died. He missed her so much and was so distracted that one day he walked onto a highway near his home and was hit by a car while trying to cross it running. He died in Surrey, at 64, just two weeks after his wife.

== See also ==
- Petrie polygon
- Skew polygon
