= Petrie polygon =

Skew polygon derived from a polytope

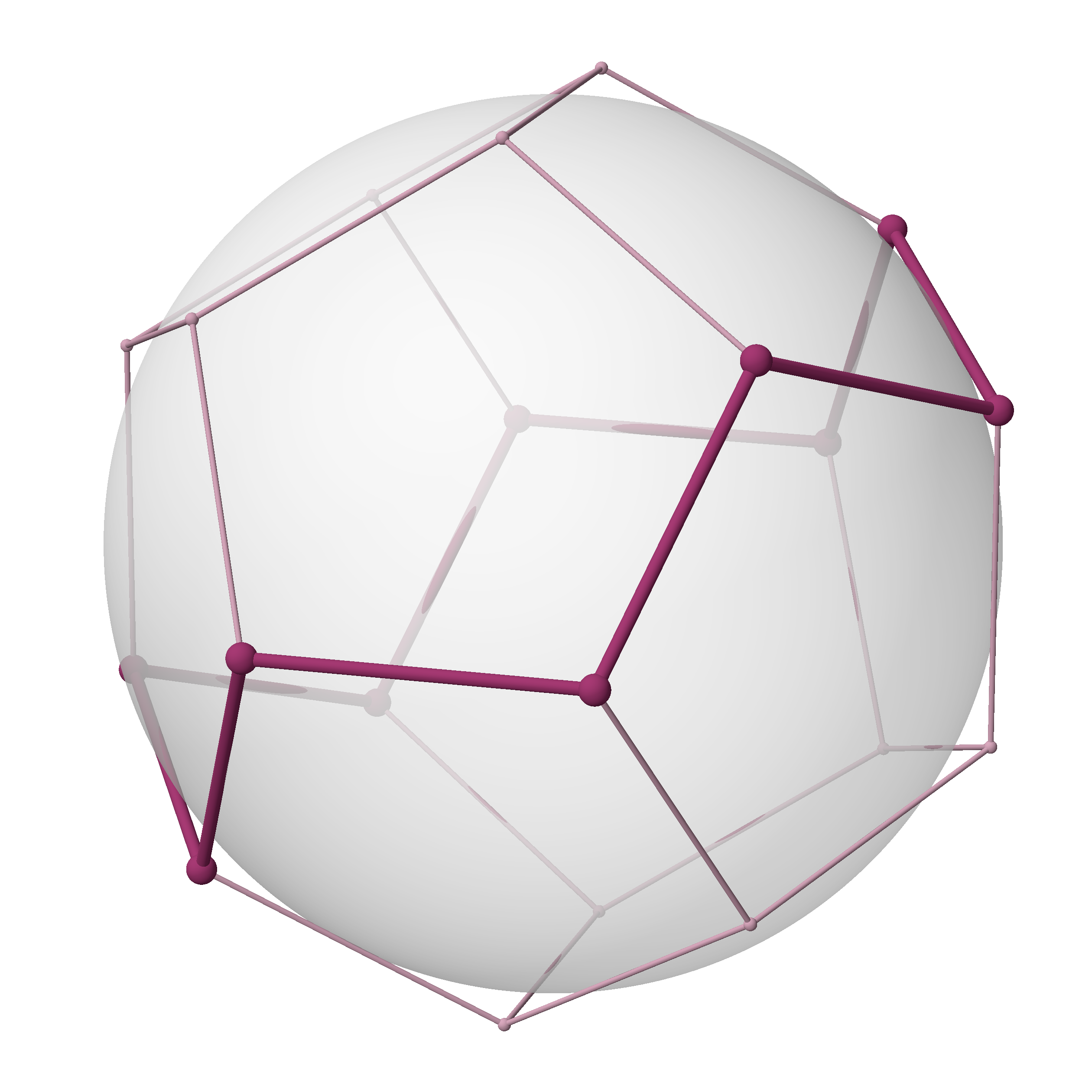
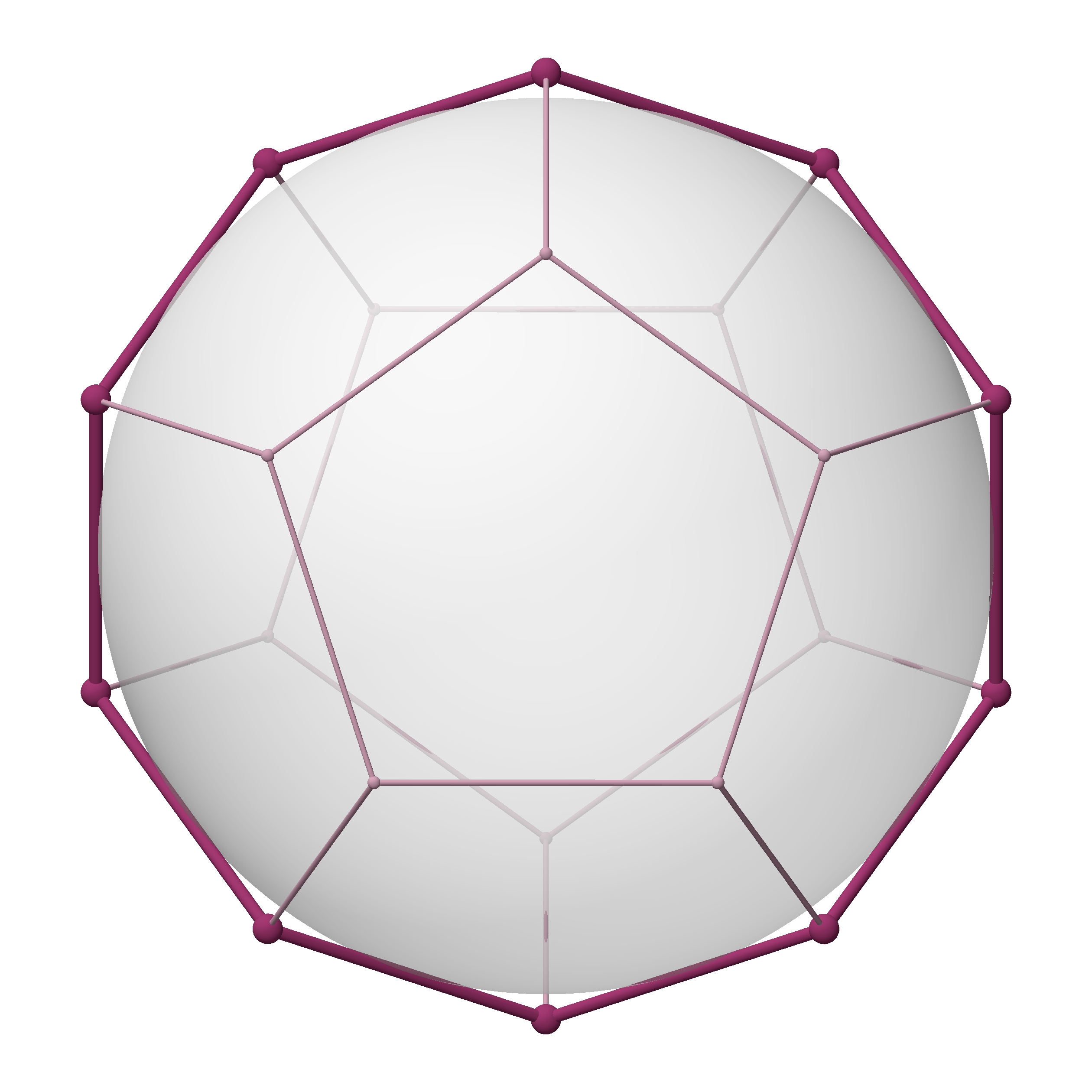
The Petrie polygon of the dodecahedron is a skew decagon. Seen from the solid's 5-fold symmetry axis it looks like a regular decagon. Every pair of consecutive sides belongs to one pentagon (but no triple does).

In geometry, a Petrie polygon for a regular polytope of n dimensions is a skew polygon in which every n – 1 consecutive sides (but no n) belongs to one of the facets. The Petrie polygon of a regular polygon is the regular polygon itself; that of a regular polyhedron is a skew polygon such that every two consecutive sides (but no three) belongs to one of the faces. Petrie polygons are named for mathematician John Flinders Petrie.

For every regular polytope there exists an orthogonal projection onto a plane such that one Petrie polygon becomes a regular polygon with the remainder of the projection interior to it. The plane in question is the Coxeter plane of the symmetry group of the polygon, and the number of sides, h, is the Coxeter number of the Coxeter group. These polygons and projected graphs are useful in visualizing symmetric structure of the higher-dimensional regular polytopes.

Petrie polygons can be defined more generally for any embedded graph. They form the faces of another embedding of the same graph, usually on a different surface, called the Petrie dual.

== History ==
John Flinders Petrie (1907–1972) was the son of Egyptologists Hilda and Flinders Petrie. He was born in 1907 and as a schoolboy showed remarkable promise of mathematical ability. In periods of intense concentration he could answer questions about complicated four-dimensional objects by visualizing them.

He first noted the importance of the regular skew polygons which appear on the surface of regular polyhedra and higher polytopes. Coxeter explained in 1937 how he and Petrie began to expand the classical subject of regular polyhedra:

One day in 1926, J. F. Petrie told me with much excitement that he had discovered two new regular polyhedral; infinite but free of false vertices. When my incredulity had begun to subside, he described them to me: one consisting of squares, six at each vertex, and one consisting of hexagons, four at each vertex.

In 1938 Petrie collaborated with Coxeter, Patrick du Val, and H. T. Flather to produce The Fifty-Nine Icosahedra for publication. Realizing the geometric facility of the skew polygons used by Petrie, Coxeter named them after his friend when he wrote Regular Polytopes.

The idea of Petrie polygons was later extended to semiregular polytopes.

== The Petrie polygons of the regular polyhedra ==
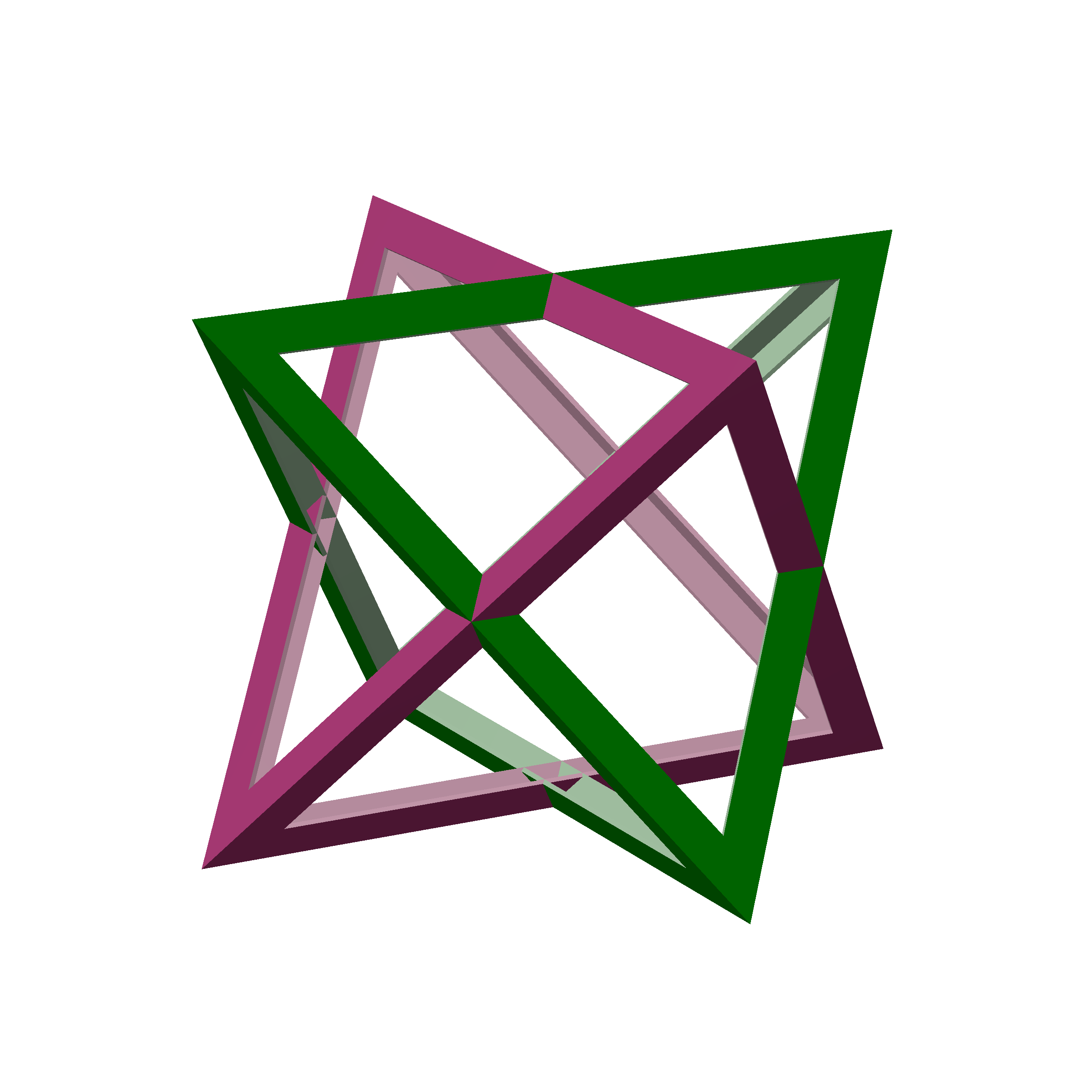
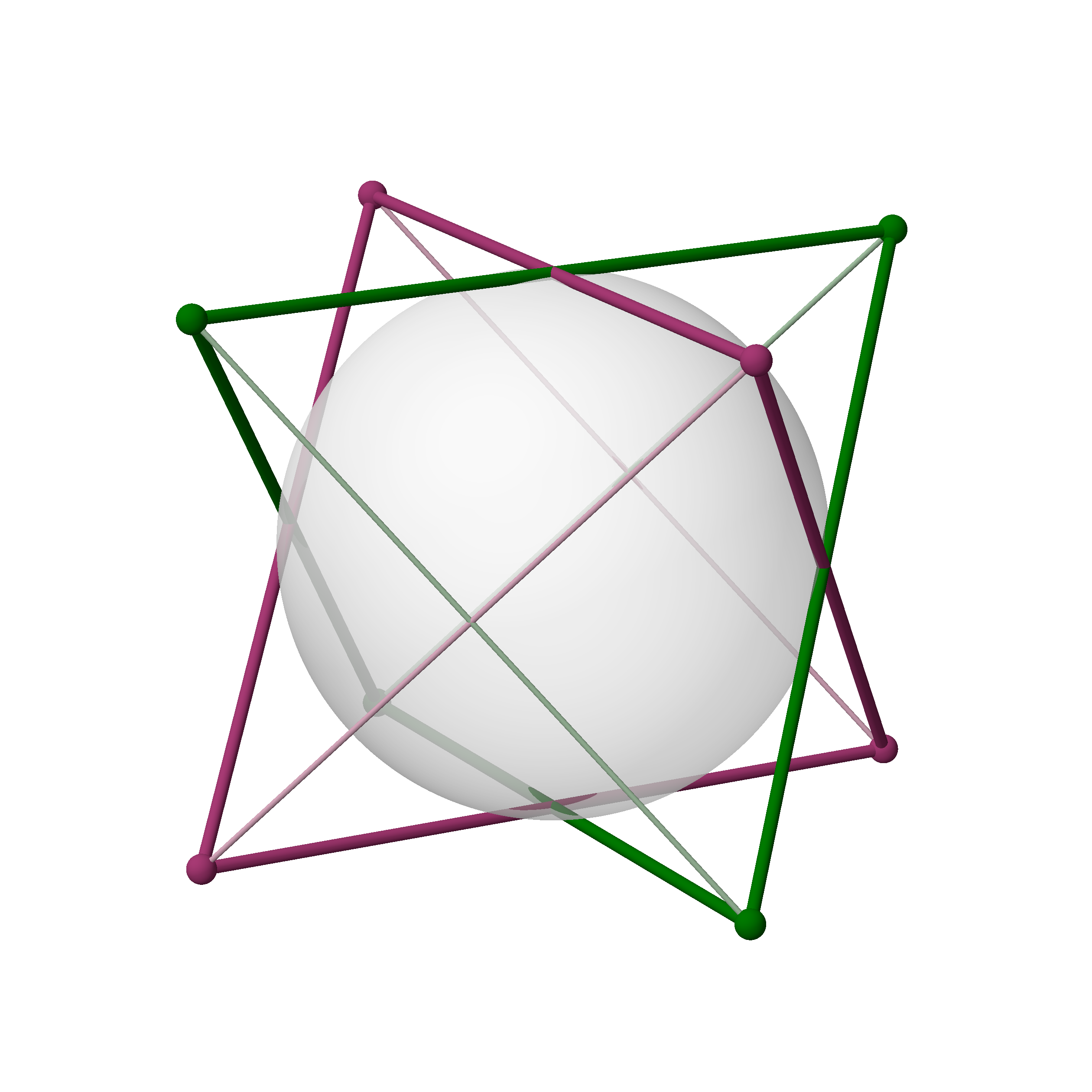
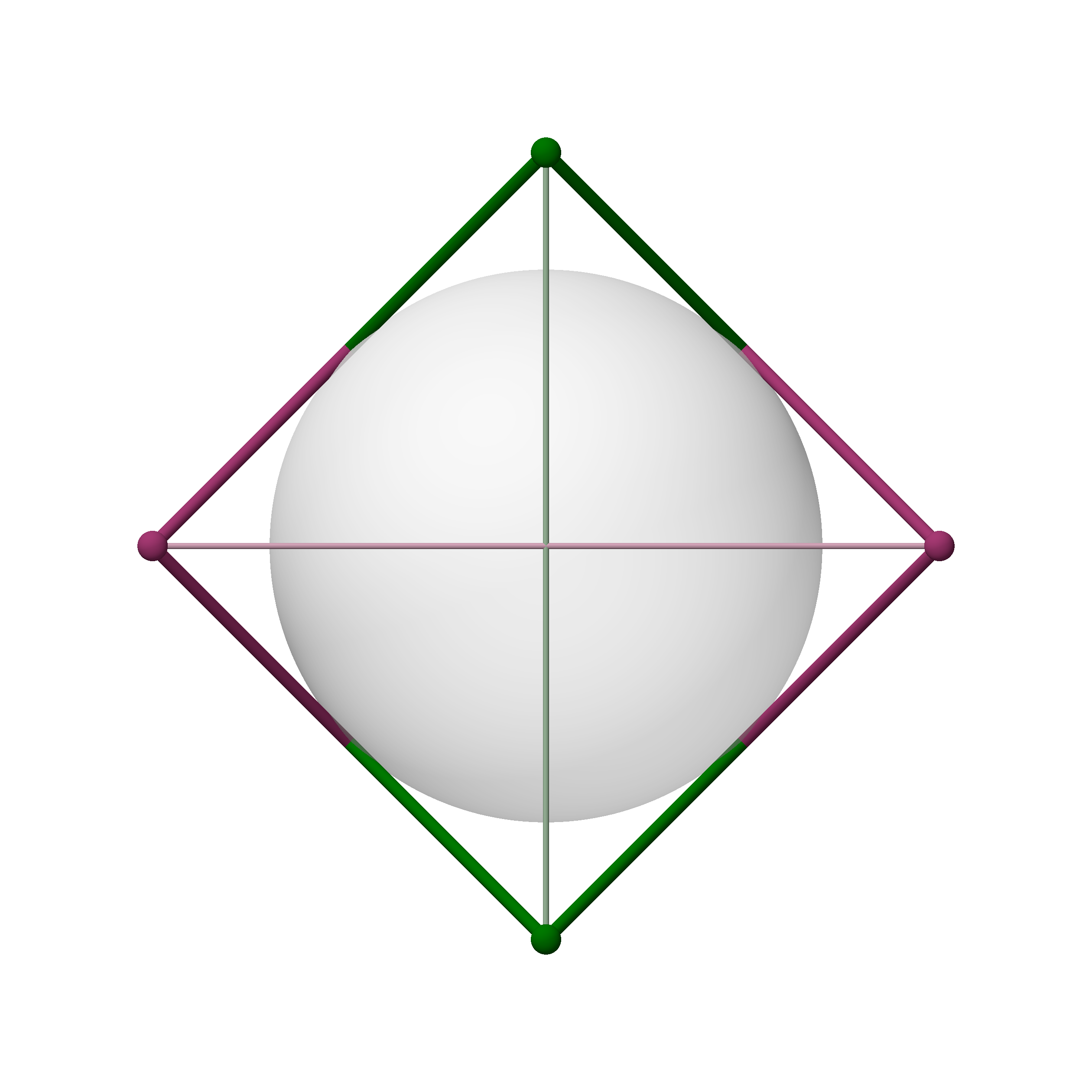
Two tetrahedra with Petrie squares
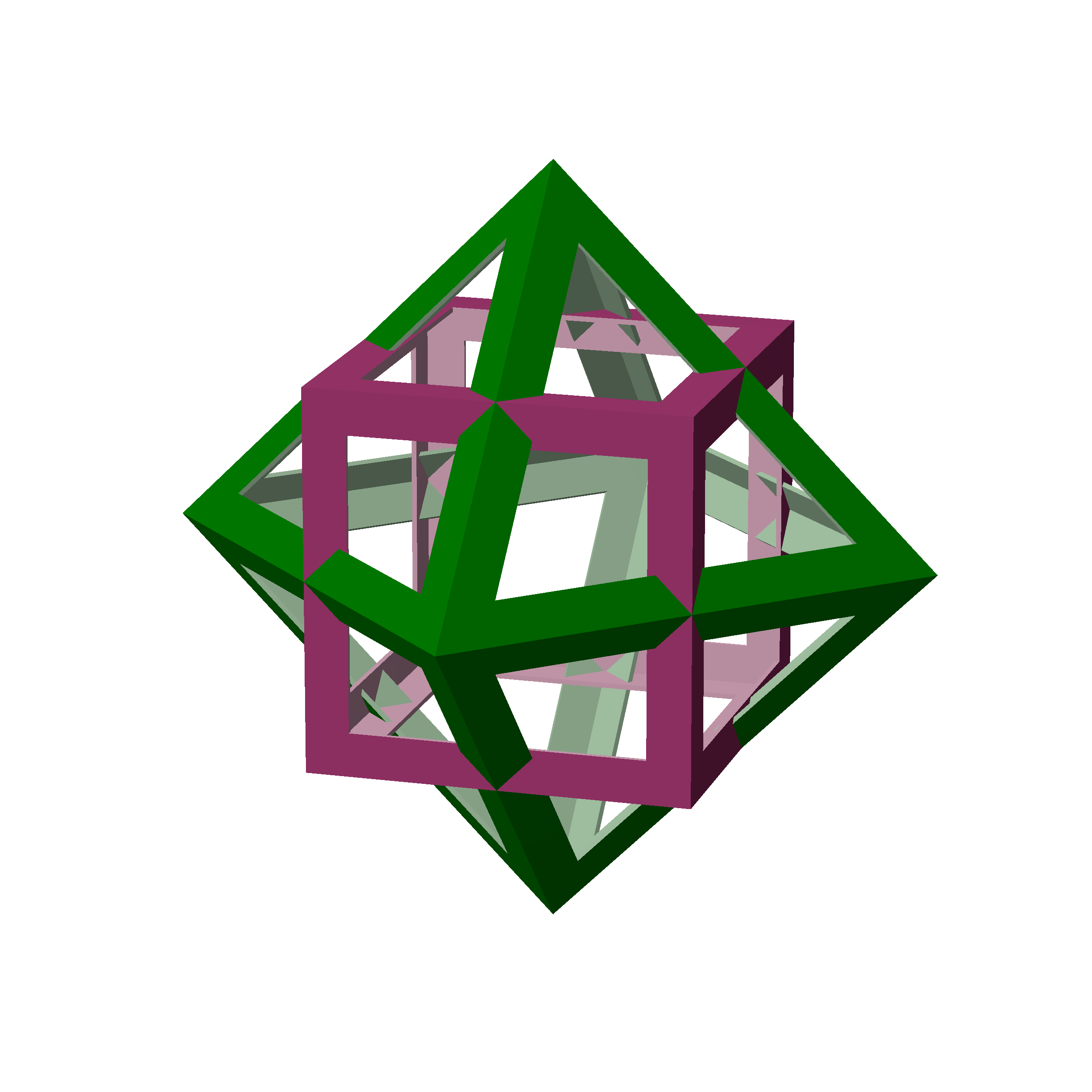
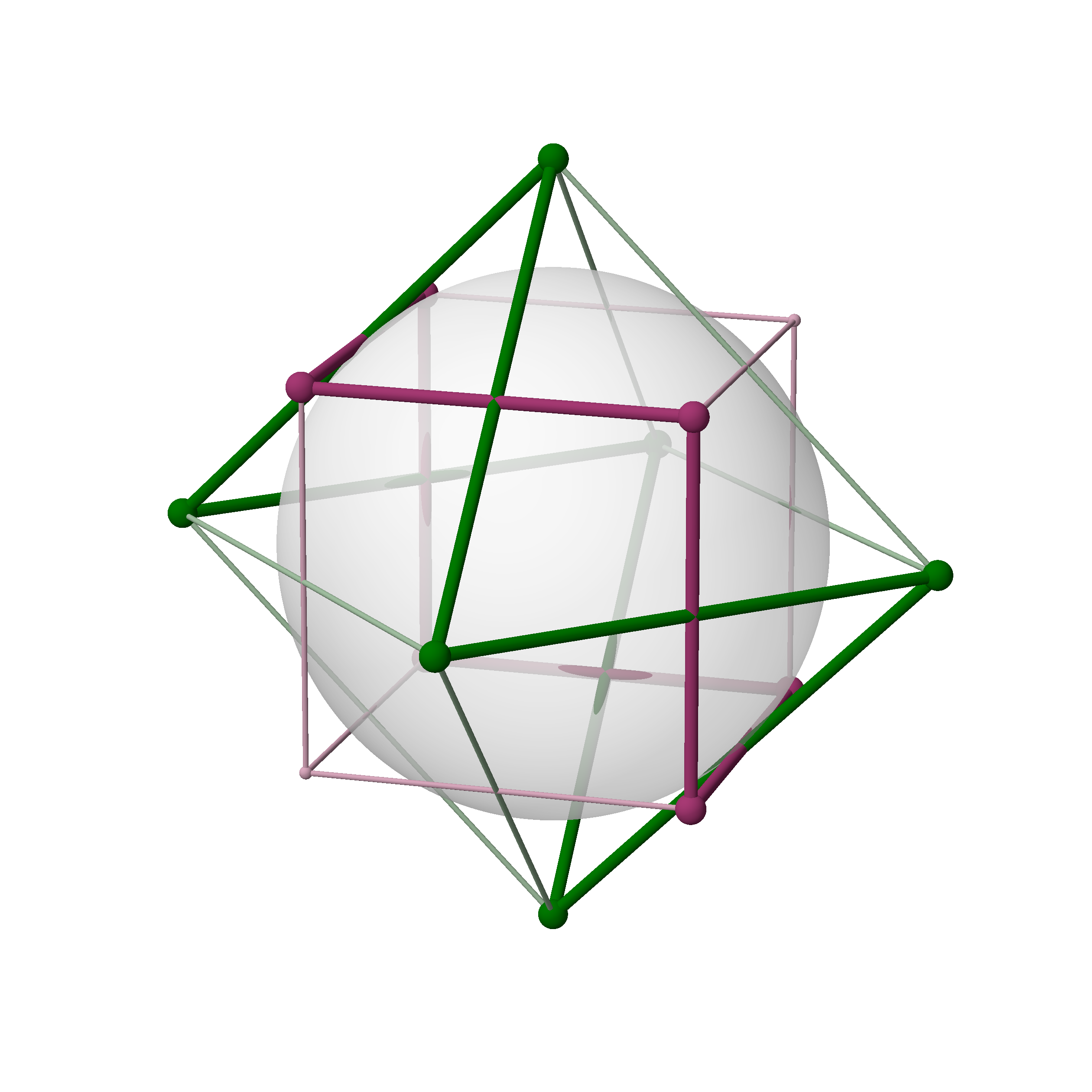
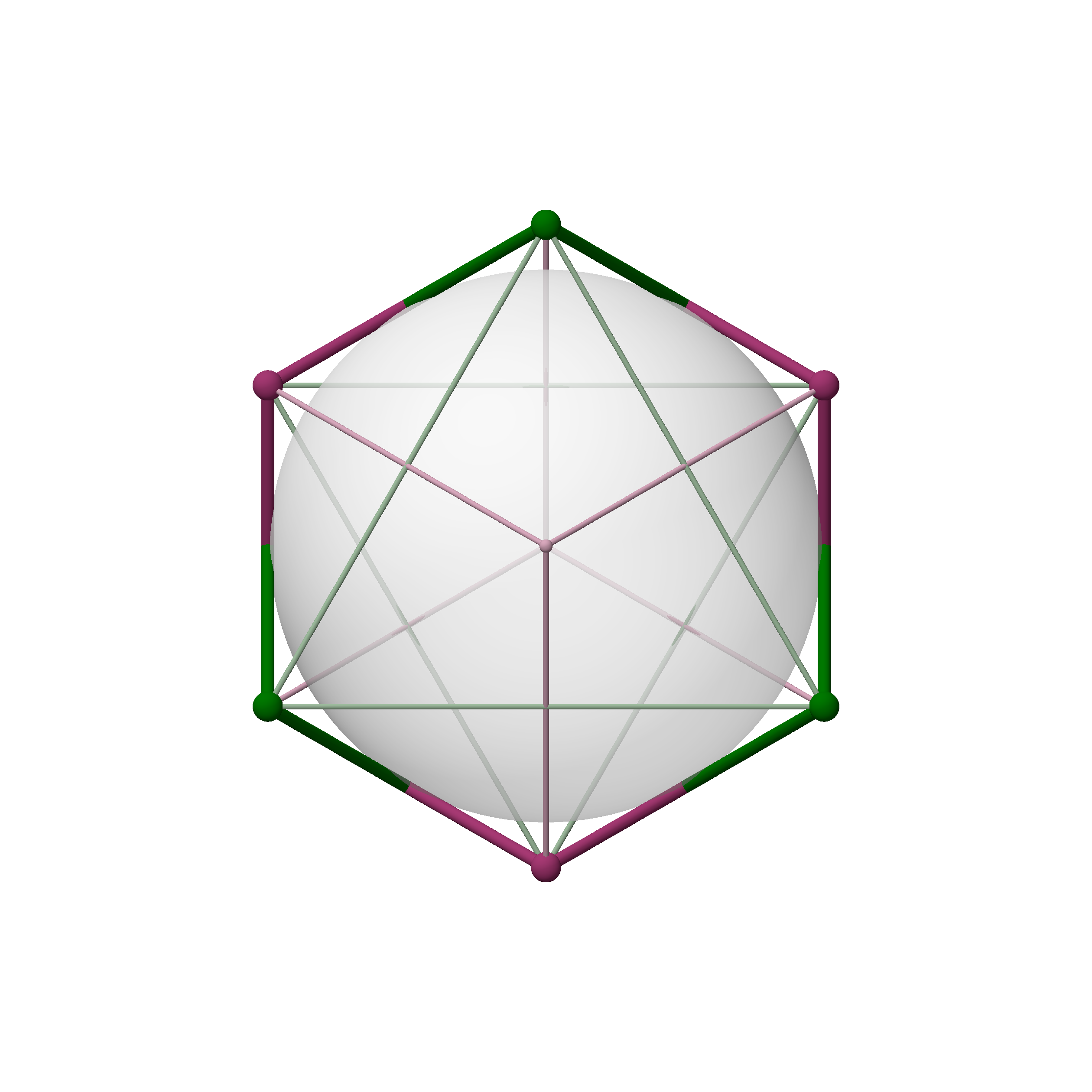
Cube and octahedron with Petrie hexagons
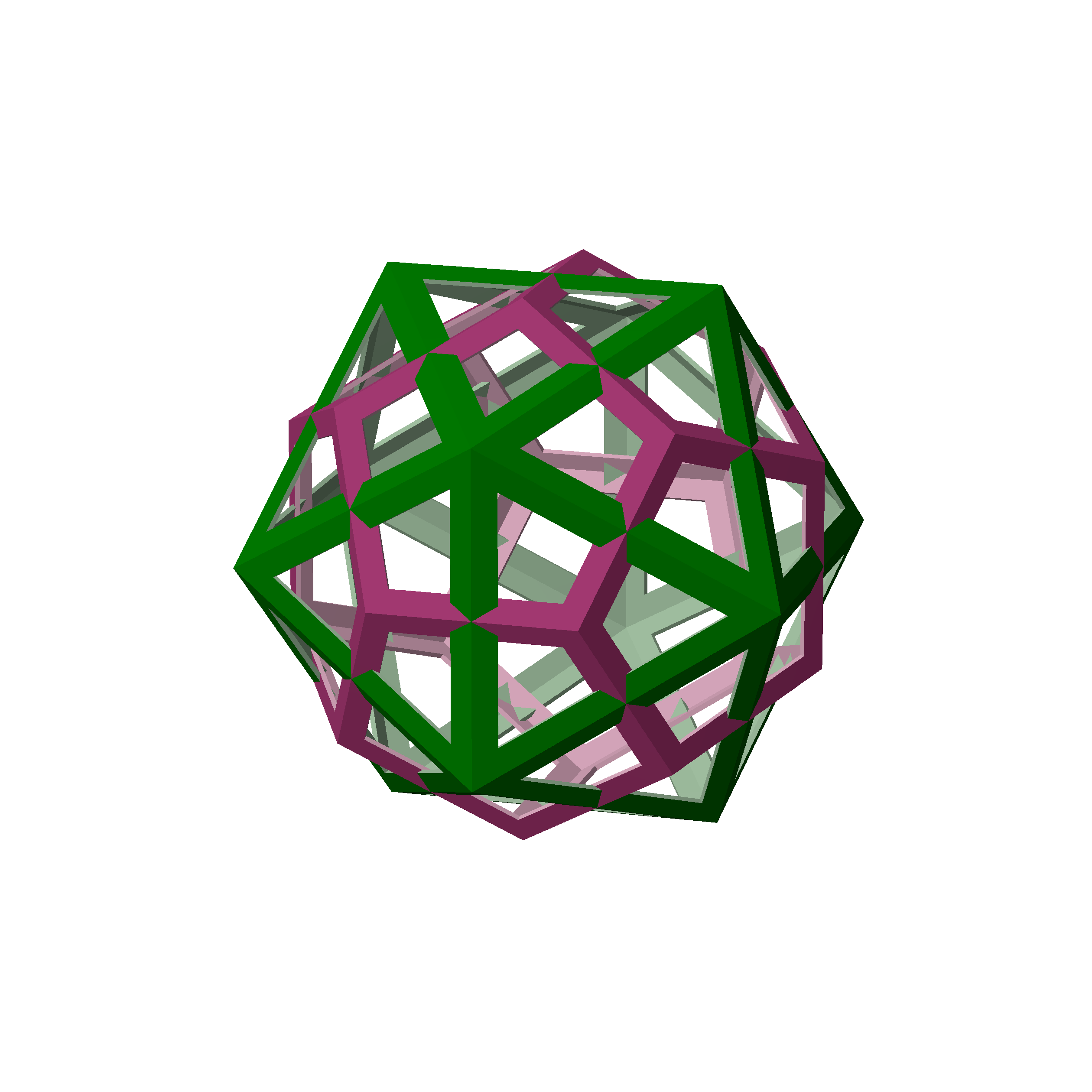
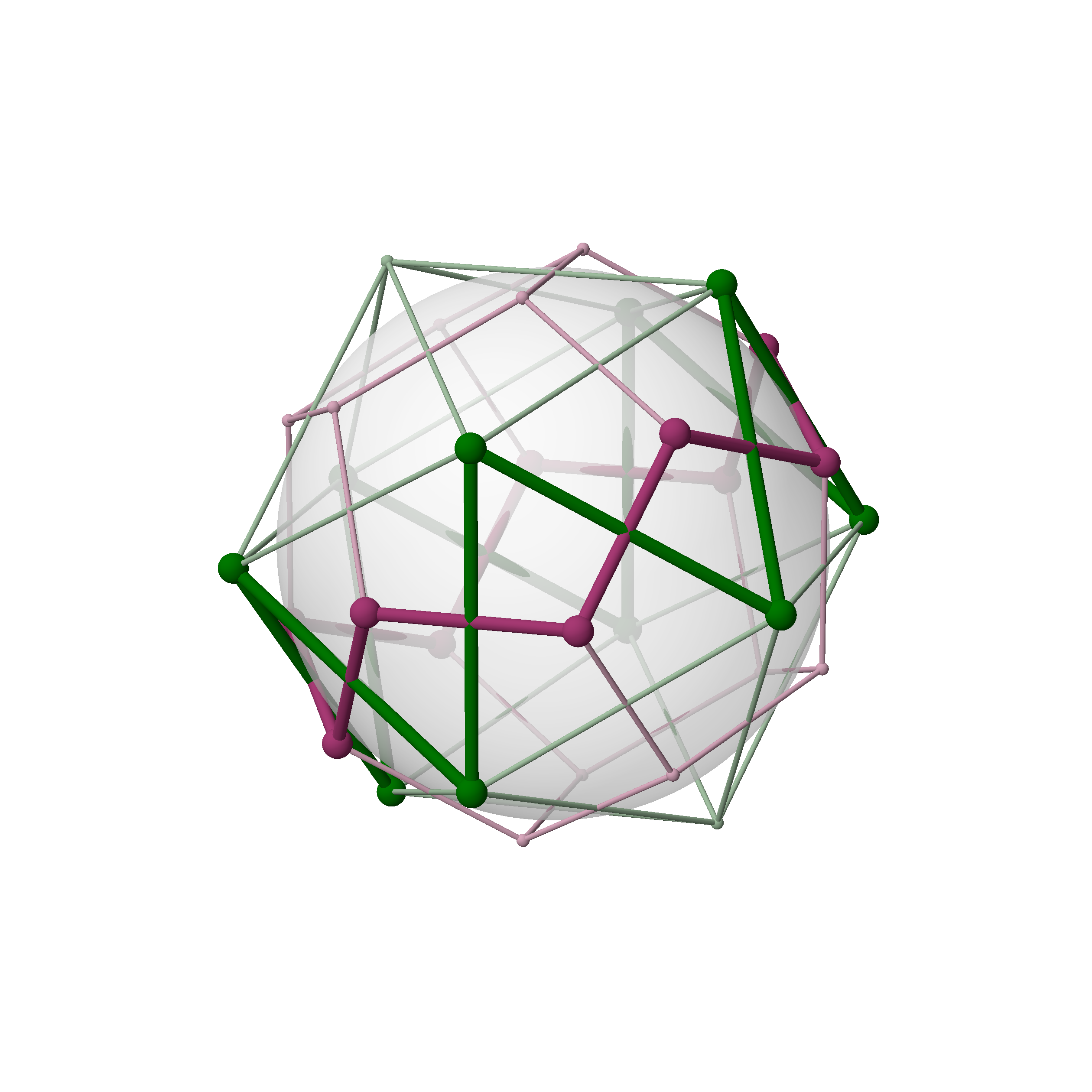
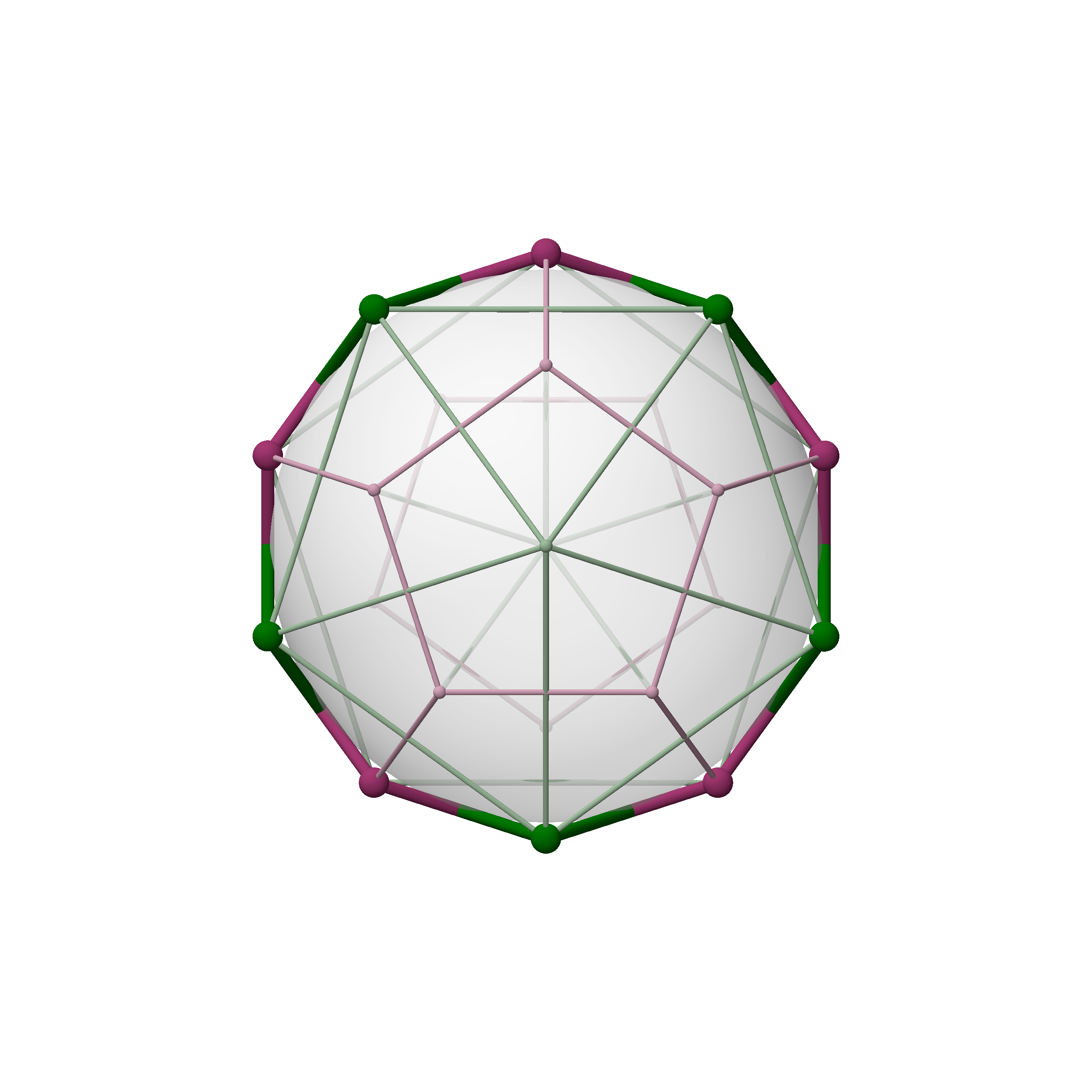
Dodecahedron and icosahedron with Petrie decagons

The regular duals, {p,q} and {q,p}, are contained within the same projected Petrie polygon. In the images of dual compounds on the right it can be seen that their Petrie polygons have rectangular intersections in the points where the edges touch the common midsphere.

Petrie polygons for Platonic solids
Square	Hexagon		Decagon	
tetrahedron {3,3}	cube {4,3}	octahedron {3,4}	dodecahedron {5,3}	icosahedron {3,5}
edge-centered	vertex-centered	face-centered	face-centered	vertex-centered
V:(4,0)	V:(6,2)	V:(6,0)	V:(10,10,0)	V:(10,2)
The Petrie polygons are the exterior of these orthogonal projections. The concentric rings of vertices are counted starting from the outside working inwards with a notation: V:(a, b, ...), ending in zero if there are no central vertices. The number of sides for {p, q} is 24/(10 − p − q) − 2.

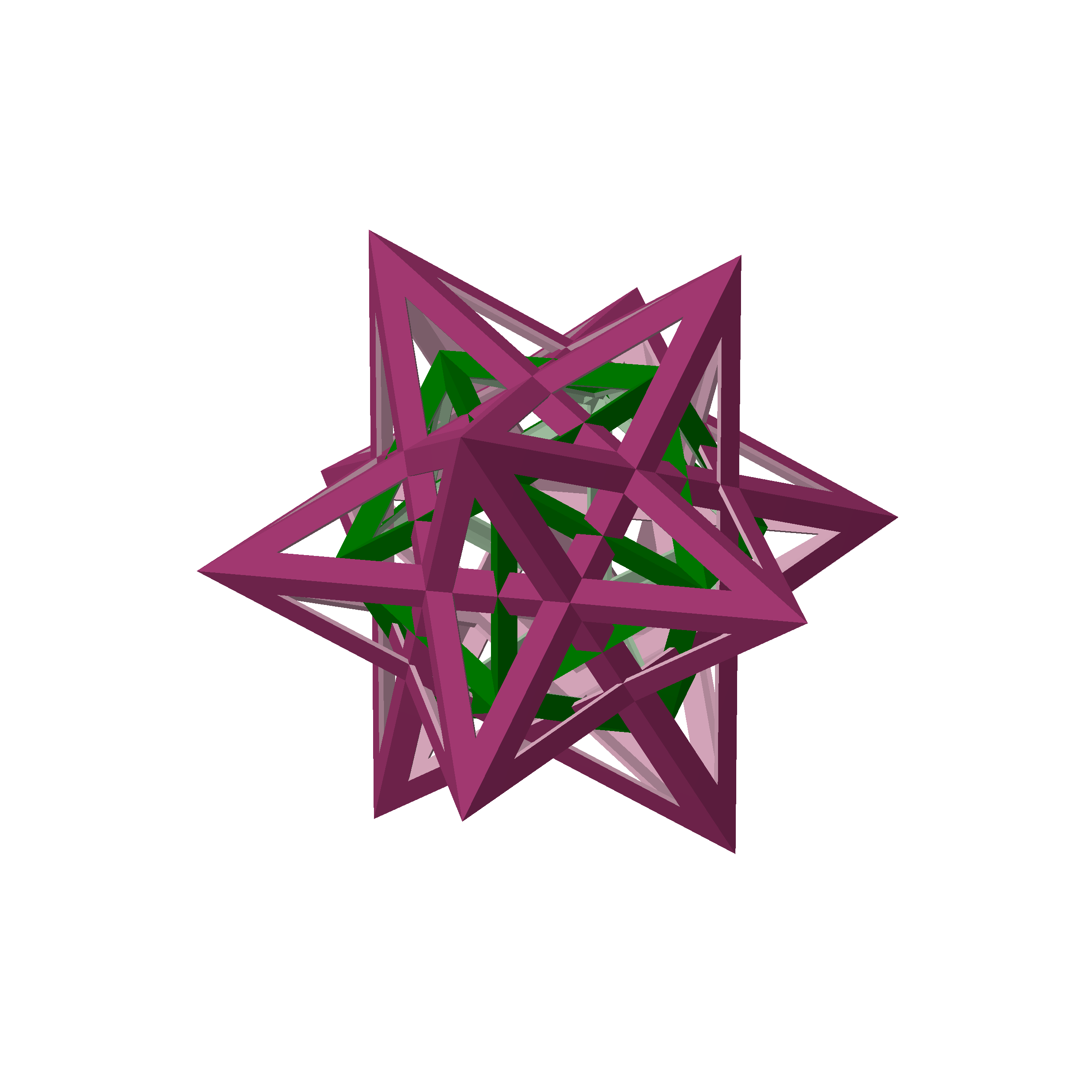
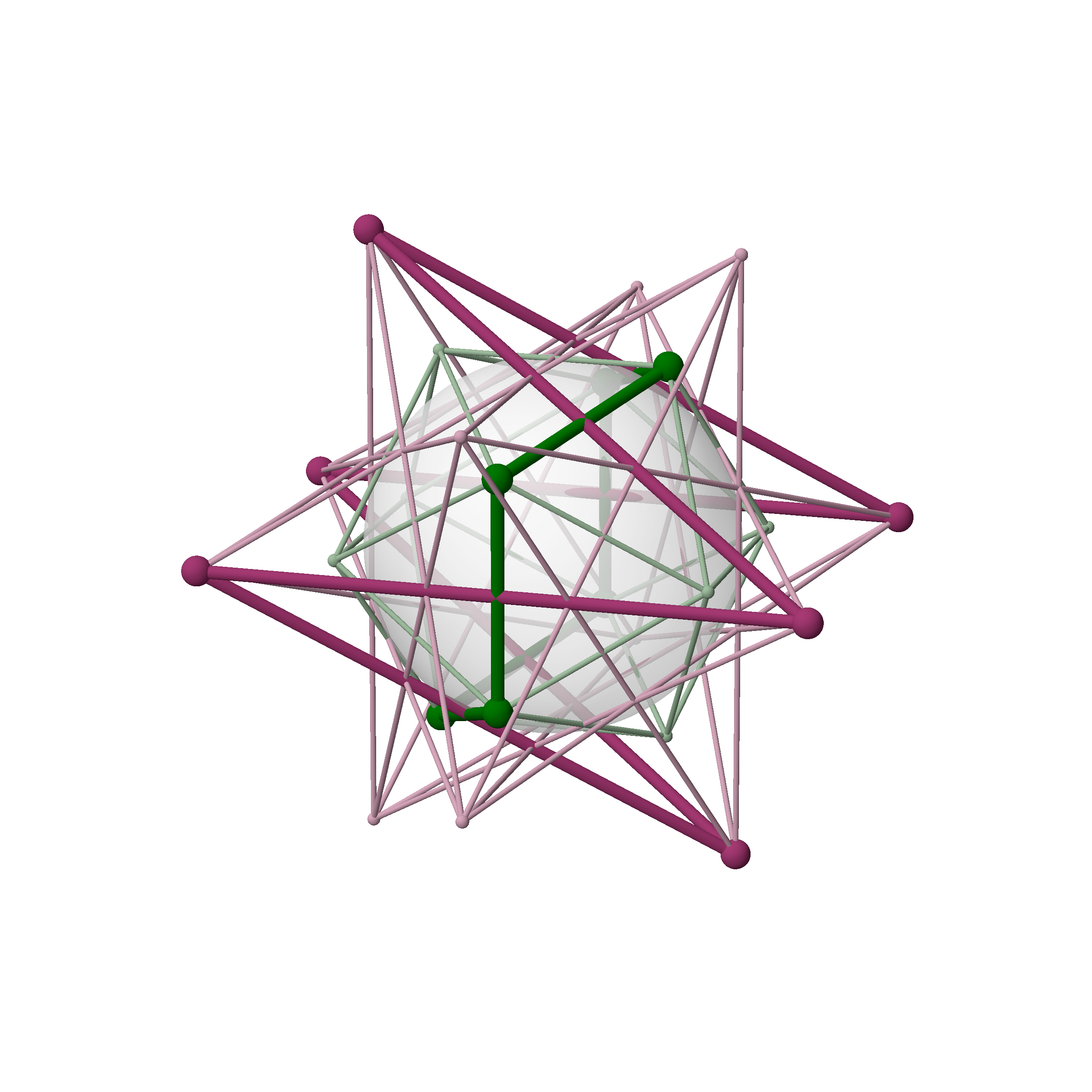
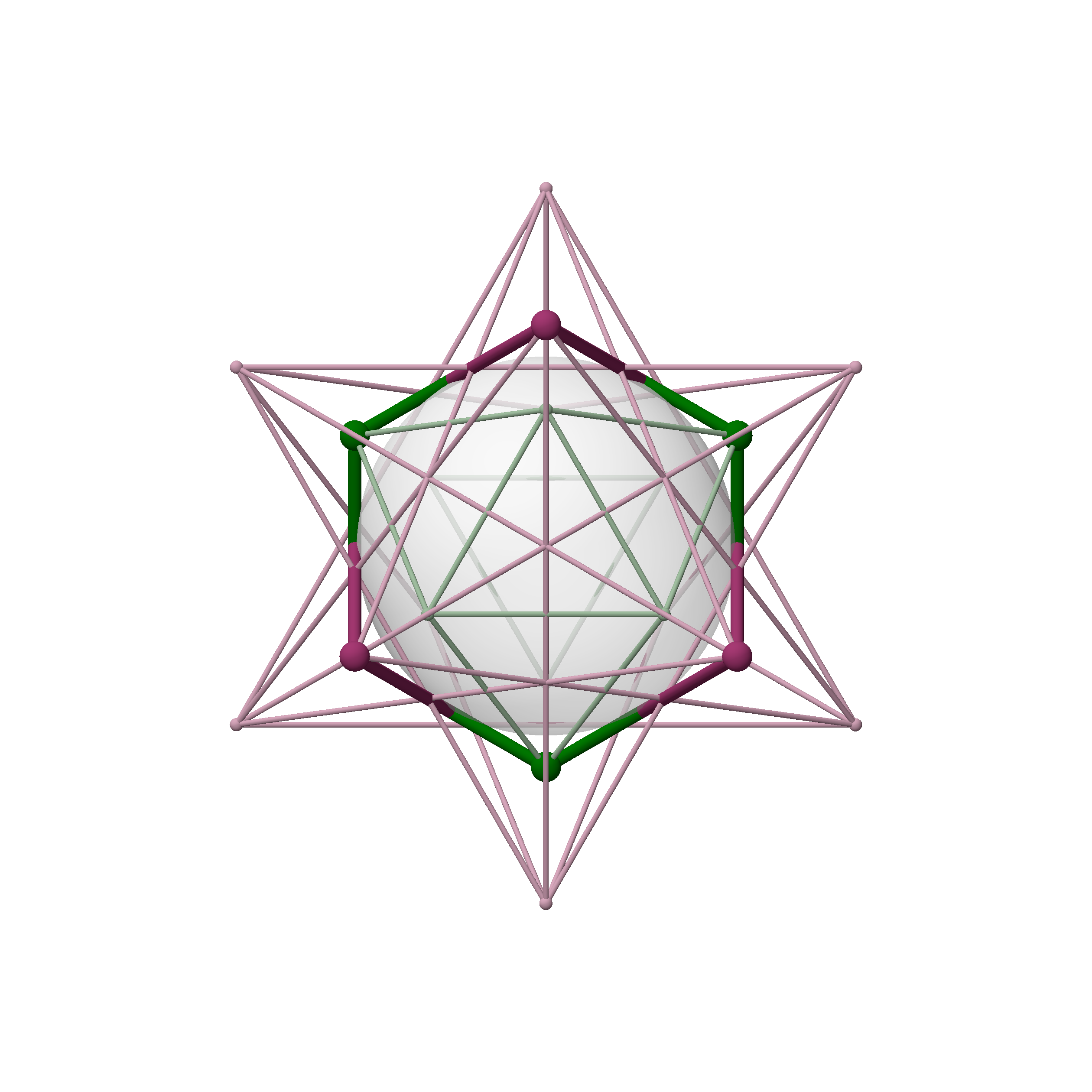
gD and sD with Petrie hexagons
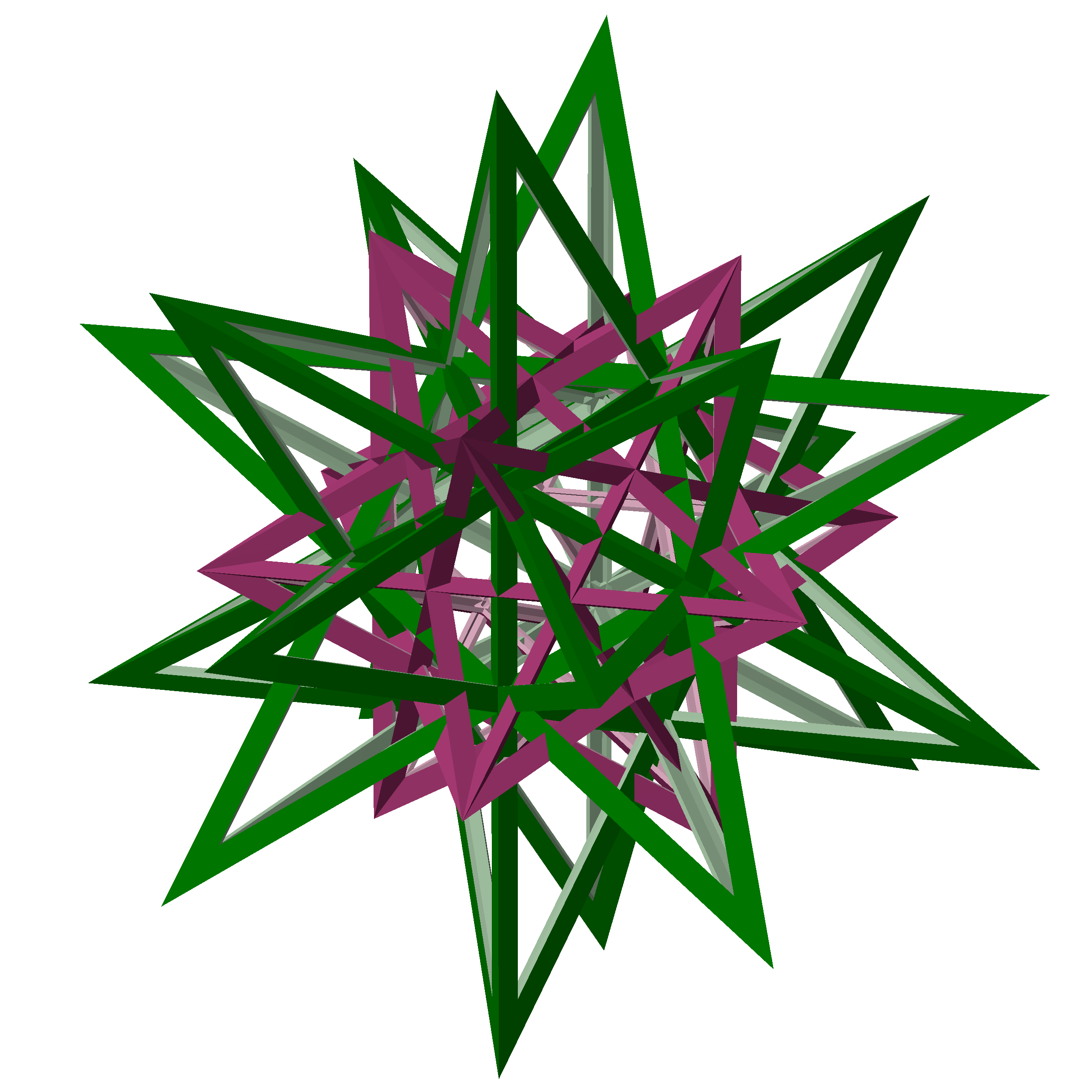
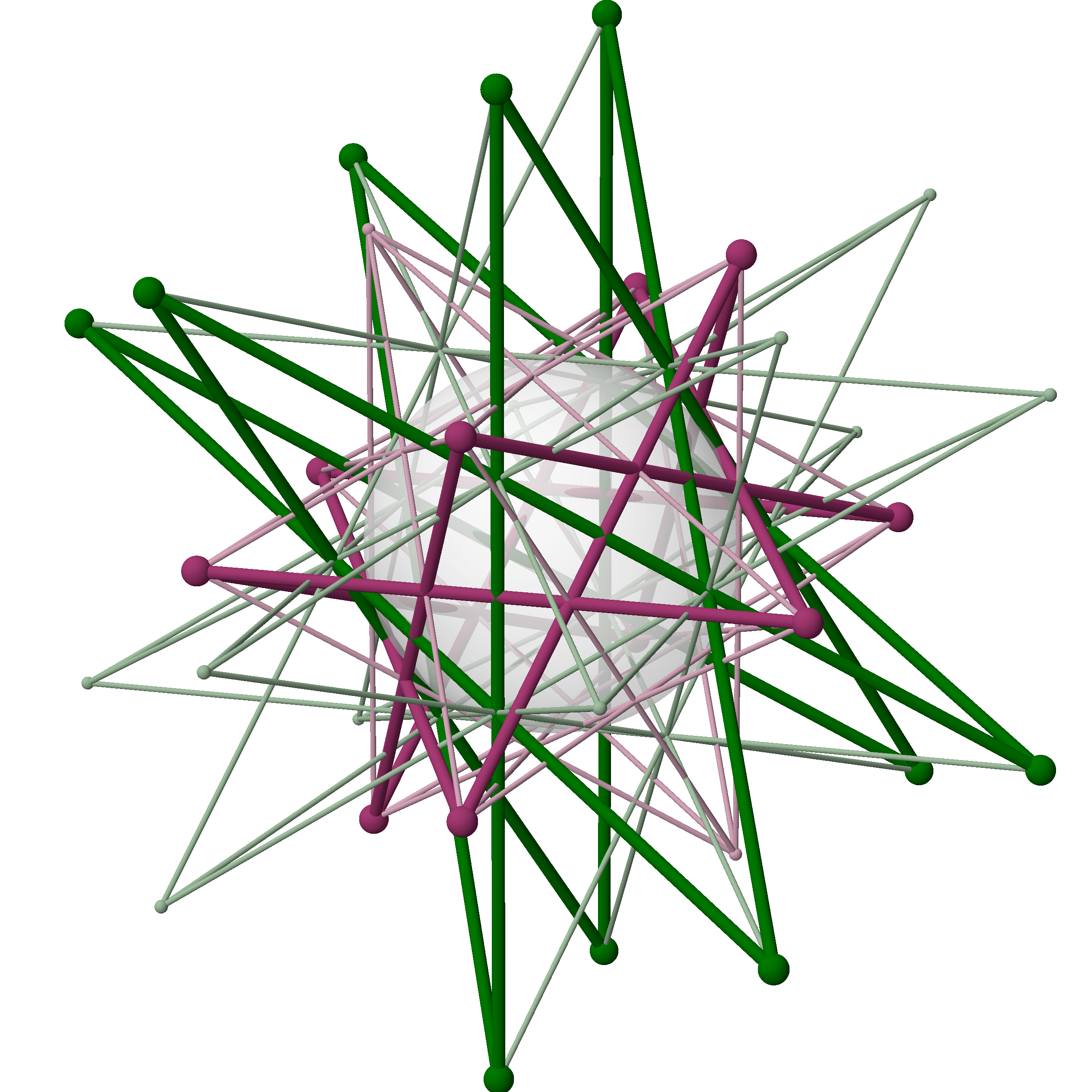
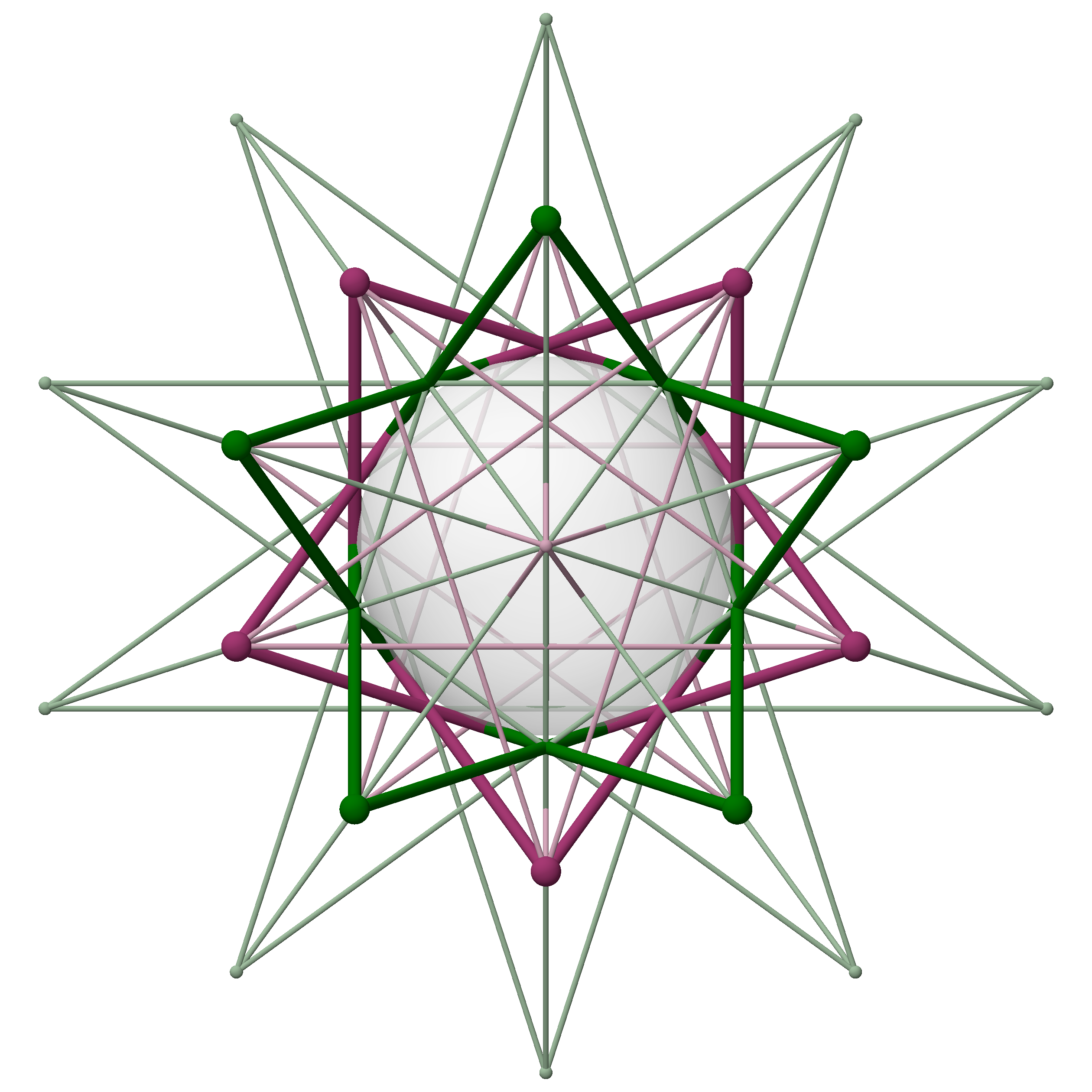
gI and gsD with Petrie decagrams

The Petrie polygons of the Kepler–Poinsot polyhedra are hexagons {6} and decagrams {10/3}.

Petrie polygons for Kepler–Poinsot polyhedra
Hexagon		Decagram	
gD {5,5/2}	sD {5,5/2}	gI {3,5/2}	gsD {5/2,3}

Infinite regular skew polygons (apeirogon) can also be defined as being the Petrie polygons of the regular tilings, having angles of 90, 120, and 60 degrees of their square, hexagon and triangular faces respectively.

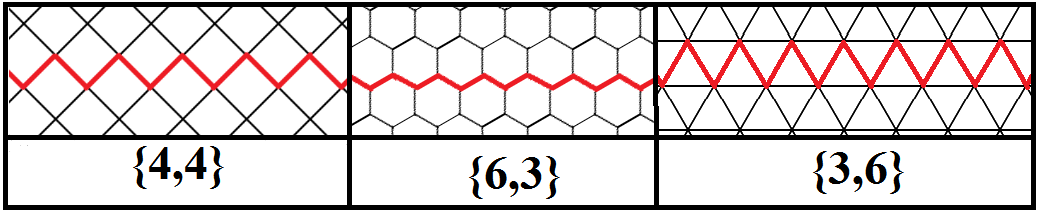

Infinite regular skew polygons also exist as Petrie polygons of the regular hyperbolic tilings, like the order-7 triangular tiling, {3,7}:

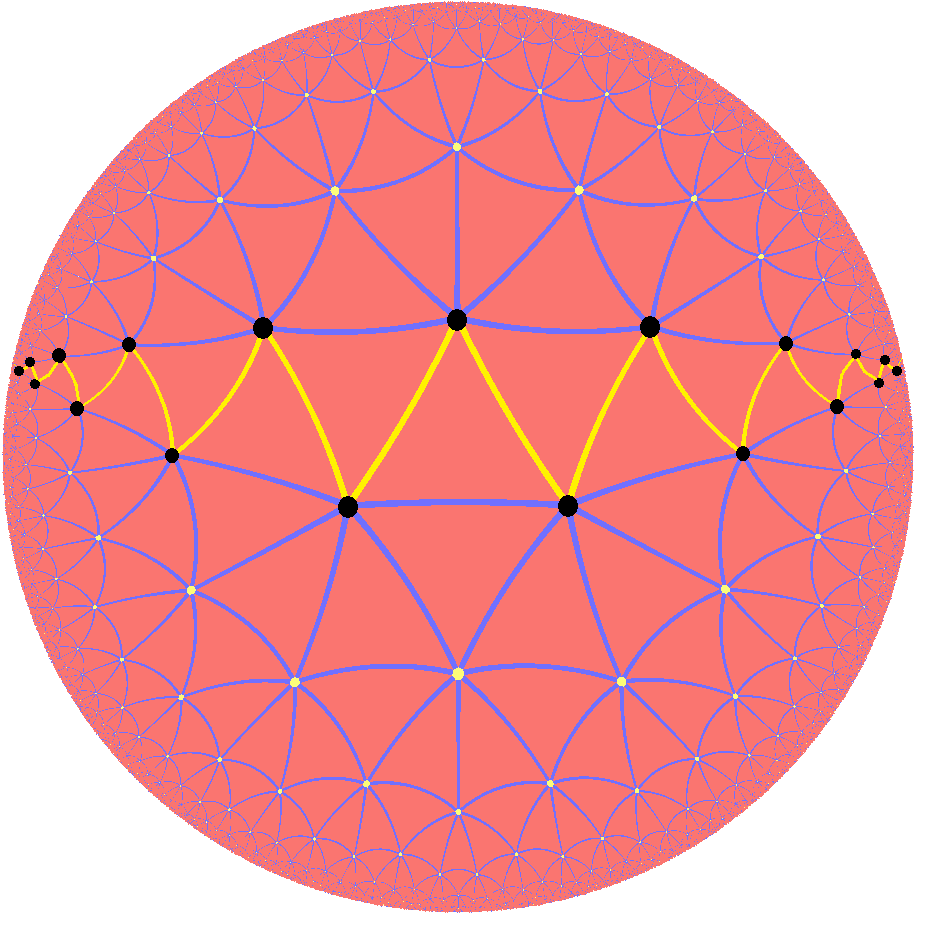

== The Petrie polygon of regular polychora (4-polytopes) ==
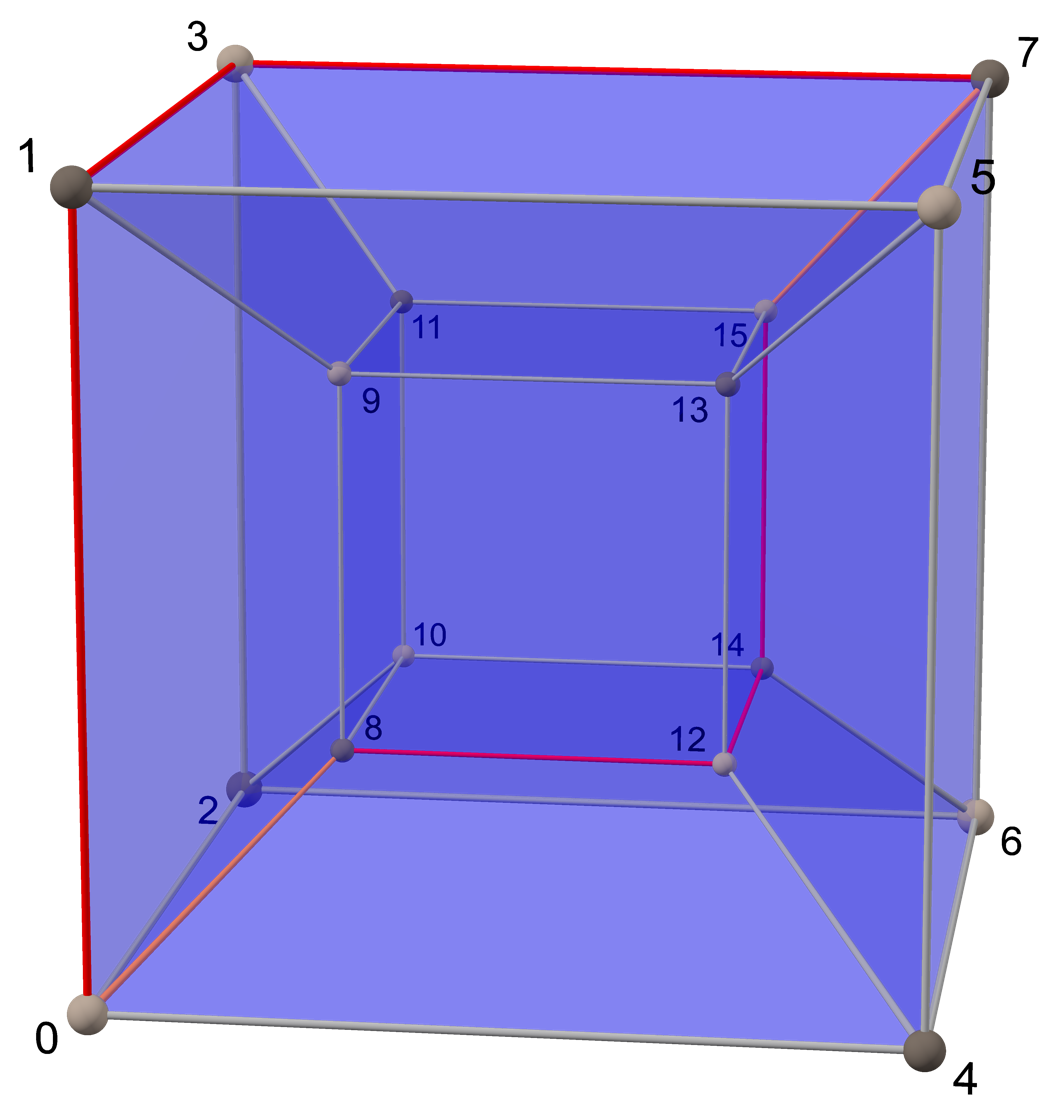
The Petrie polygon of the tesseract is an octagon. Every triple of consecutive sides belongs to one of its eight cubic cells.

The Petrie polygon for the regular polychora {p, q ,r} can also be determined, such that every three consecutive sides (but no four) belong to one of the polychoron's cells. As the surface of a 4-polytope is a 3-dimensional space (the 3-sphere), the Petrie polygon of a regular 4-polytope is a 3-dimensional helix in this surface.

{3,3,3} 5-cell 5 sides V:(5,0)	{3,3,4} 16-cell 8 sides V:(8,0)	{4,3,3} tesseract 8 sides V:(8,8,0)
{3,4,3} 24-cell 12 sides V:(12,6,6,0)	{3,3,5} 600-cell 30 sides V:(30,30,30,30,0)	{5,3,3} 120-cell 30 sides V:((30,60)^{3},60^{3},30,60,0)

== The Petrie polygon projections of regular and uniform polytopes ==
The Petrie polygon projections are useful for the visualization of polytopes of dimension four and higher.

=== Hypercubes ===
A hypercube of dimension n has a Petrie polygon of size 2n, which is also the number of its facets.
So each of the (n − 1)-cubes forming its surface has n − 1 sides of the Petrie polygon among its edges.

Hypercubes
The 1-cubes's Petrie digon looks identical to the 1-cube. But the 1-cube has a single edge, while the digon has two. The 2-cube's Petrie square is identical to the 2-cube. Each pair of consecutive sides of the 3-cube's Petrie hexagon belongs to one of its six square faces. Each triple of consecutive sides of the 4-cube's Petrie octagon belongs to one of its eight cube cells. The images show how the Petrie polygon for dimension n + 1 can be constructed from that for dimension n: The first half (edges between vertices with numbers < 2^{n}) remains where it is.; The second half is moved to the next dimension (2^{n} added to vertex numbers).; Two new edges (shown in orange) are added to connect the two parts.; (For n = 1 the first and the second half are the two distinct but coinciding edges of a digon.) The sides of each Petrie polygon belong to these dimensions: (1, 1), (1, 2, 1, 2), (1, 2, 3, 1, 2, 3), (1, 2, 3, 4, 1, 2, 3, 4), etc. So any n consecutive sides belong to different dimensions.
Square	Cube	Tesseract

== See also ==
- Petrie dual

Fundamental convex regular and uniform polytopes in dimensions 2–10
Family	A_{n}	B_{n}	I_{2}(p) / D_{n}	E_{6} / E_{7} / E_{8} / F_{4} / G_{2}	H_{n}
Regular polygon	Triangle	Square	p-gon	Hexagon	Pentagon
Uniform polyhedron	Tetrahedron	Octahedron • Cube	Demicube		Dodecahedron • Icosahedron
Uniform polychoron	Pentachoron	16-cell • Tesseract	Demitesseract	24-cell	120-cell • 600-cell
Uniform 5-polytope	5-simplex	5-orthoplex • 5-cube	5-demicube		
Uniform 6-polytope	6-simplex	6-orthoplex • 6-cube	6-demicube	1_{22} • 2_{21}	
Uniform 7-polytope	7-simplex	7-orthoplex • 7-cube	7-demicube	1_{32} • 2_{31} • 3_{21}	
Uniform 8-polytope	8-simplex	8-orthoplex • 8-cube	8-demicube	1_{42} • 2_{41} • 4_{21}	
Uniform 9-polytope	9-simplex	9-orthoplex • 9-cube	9-demicube		
Uniform 10-polytope	10-simplex	10-orthoplex • 10-cube	10-demicube		
Uniform n-polytope	n-simplex	n-orthoplex • n-cube	n-demicube	1_{k2} • 2_{k1} • k_{21}	n-pentagonal polytope
Topics: Polytope families • Regular polytope • List of regular polytopes and compounds • Polytope operations
