= Apeirotope =

Polytope with infinitely many facets

The regular hexagonal tiling is an example of a 3-dimensional apeirotope

In geometry, an apeirotope or infinite polytope is a generalized polytope which has infinitely many facets.

== Definition ==
=== Abstract apeirotope ===
An abstract n-polytope is a partially ordered set P (whose elements are called faces) such that P contains a least face and a greatest face, each maximal totally ordered subset (called a flag) contains exactly n + 2 faces, P is strongly connected, and there are exactly two faces that lie strictly between a and b are two faces whose ranks differ by two. An abstract polytope is called an abstract apeirotope if it has infinitely many faces.

An abstract polytope is called regular if its automorphism group Γ(P) acts transitively on all of the flags of P.

== Classification ==
There are two main geometric classes of apeirotope:

- honeycombs in n dimensions, which completely fill an n-dimensional space.
- skew apeirotopes, comprising an n-dimensional manifold in a higher space

=== Honeycombs ===
In general, a honeycomb in n dimensions is an infinite example of a polytope in n + 1 dimensions.

Tilings of the plane and close-packed space-fillings of polyhedra are examples of honeycombs in two and three dimensions respectively.

A line divided into infinitely many finite segments is an example of an apeirogon.

=== Skew apeirotopes ===
==== Skew apeirogons ====
A skew apeirogon in two dimensions forms a zig-zag line in the plane. If the zig-zag is even and symmetrical, then the apeirogon is regular.

Skew apeirogons can be constructed in any number of dimensions. In three dimensions, a regular skew apeirogon traces out a helical spiral and may be either left- or right-handed.

==== Infinite skew polyhedra ====
There are three regular skew apeirohedra, which look rather like polyhedral sponges:

- 6 squares around each vertex, Coxeter symbol {4,6|4}
- 4 hexagons around each vertex, Coxeter symbol {6,4|4}
- 6 hexagons around each vertex, Coxeter symbol {6,6|3}

There are thirty regular apeirohedra in Euclidean space. These include those listed above, as well as (in the plane) polytopes of type: {∞,3}, {∞,4}, {∞,6} and in 3-dimensional space, blends of these with either an apeirogon or a line segment, and the "pure" 3-dimensional apeirohedra (12 in number)
