= Hosohedron =

Spherical polyhedron composed of lunes

Set of regular n-gonal hosohedra
- Example regular hexagonal hosohedron on a sphere
- Type: regular polyhedron or spherical tiling
- Faces: n digons
- Edges: n
- Vertices: 2
- Euler char.: 2
- Vertex configuration: 2^{n}
- Wythoff symbol: n | 2 2
- Schläfli symbol: {2,n}
- Symmetry group: D_{nh} [2,n] (*22n) order 4n
- Rotation group: D_{n} [2,n]^{+} (22n) order 2n
- Dual polyhedron: regular n-gonal dihedron

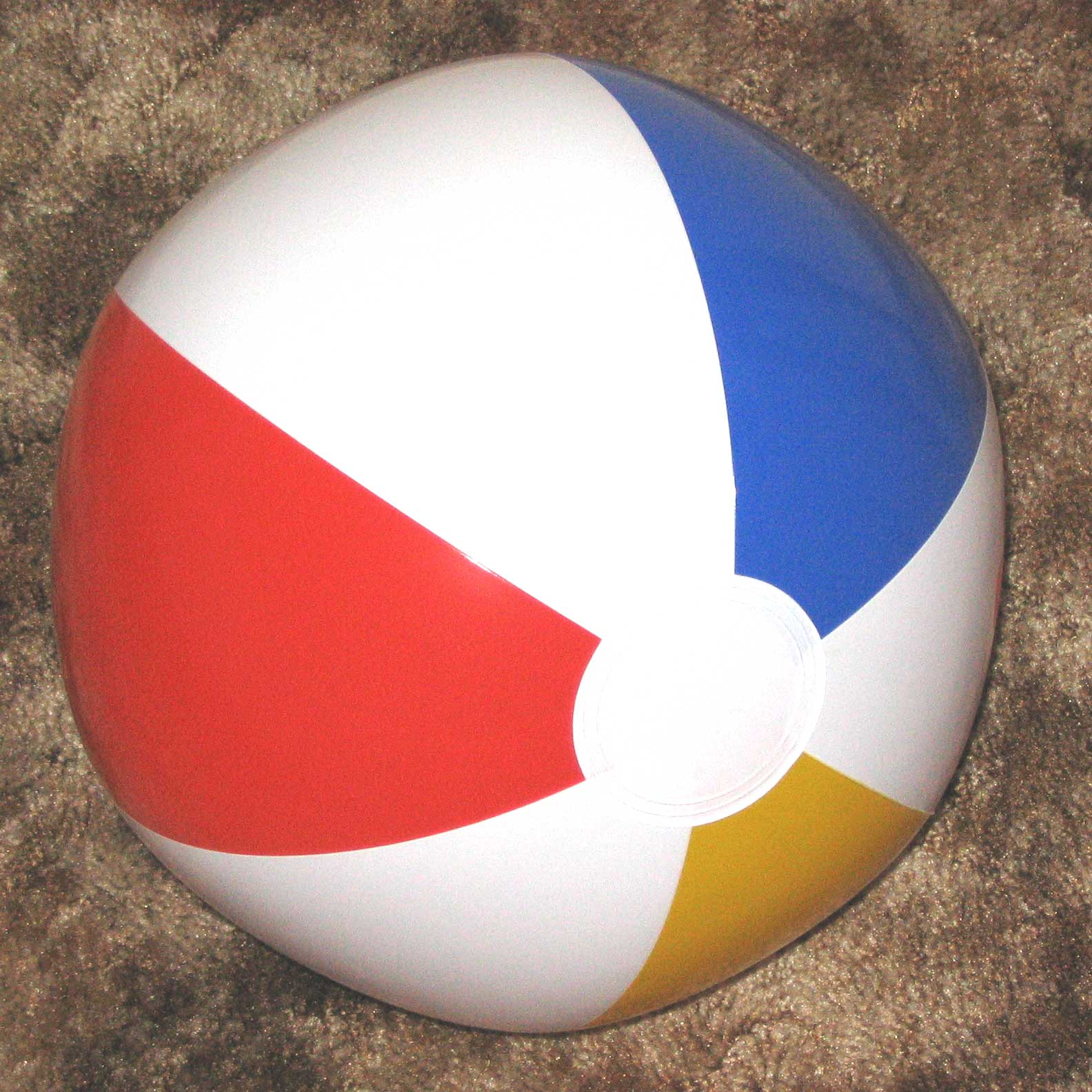
This beach ball would be a hosohedron with 6 spherical lune faces, if the 2 white caps on the ends were removed and the lunes extended to meet at the poles.

In spherical geometry, an n-gonal hosohedron is a tessellation of lunes on a spherical surface, such that each lune shares the same two polar opposite vertices.

A regular n-gonal hosohedron has Schläfli symbol {2,n}, with each spherical lune having internal angle 2π/nradians (360/n degrees).

== Hosohedra as regular polyhedra ==
For a regular polyhedron whose Schläfli symbol is {m, n}, the number of polygonal faces is :

$$N_2=\frac{4n}{2m+2n-mn}.$$

The Platonic solids known to antiquity are the only integer solutions for m ≥ 3 and n ≥ 3. The restriction m ≥ 3 enforces that the polygonal faces must have at least three sides.

When considering polyhedra as a spherical tiling, this restriction may be relaxed, since digons (2-gons) can be represented as spherical lunes, having non-zero area.

Allowing m = 2 makes

$$N_2=\frac{4n}{2\times2+2n-2n}=n,$$

and admits a new infinite class of regular polyhedra, which are the hosohedra. On a spherical surface, the polyhedron {2, n} is represented as n abutting lunes, with interior angles of 2π/n. All these spherical lunes share two common vertices.

A regular trigonal hosohedron, {2,3}, represented as a tessellation of 3 spherical lunes on a sphere.	A regular tetragonal hosohedron, {2,4}, represented as a tessellation of 4 spherical lunes on a sphere.

Family of regular hosohedra · *n22 symmetry mutations of regular hosohedral tilings: nn
Space	Spherical						...	Euclidean
Tiling name	Nulligonal hosohedron	Henagonal hosohedron	Digonal hosohedron	Trigonal hosohedron	Square hosohedron	Pentagonal hosohedron	...	Apeirogonal hosohedron
Tiling image							...	
Schläfli symbol	{1,1}	{2,1}	{2,2}	{2,3}	{2,4}	{2,5}	...	{2,∞}
Coxeter diagram							...	
Faces and edges	1	1	2	3	4	5	...	∞
Vertices	1	2	2	2	2	2	...	2
Vertex config.	1	2	2.2	2^{3}	2^{4}	2^{5}	...	2^{∞}

== Kaleidoscopic symmetry ==
The $2n$ digonal spherical lune faces of a $2n$-hosohedron, $\{2,2n\}$, represent the fundamental domains of dihedral symmetry in three dimensions: the cyclic symmetry $C_{nv}$, $[n]$, $(*nn)$, order $2n$. The reflection domains can be shown by alternately colored lunes as mirror images.

Bisecting each lune into two spherical triangles creates an $n$-gonal bipyramid, which represents the dihedral symmetry $D_{nh}$, order $4n$.

Different representations of the kaleidoscopic symmetry of certain small hosohedra
Symmetry (order $2n$)	Schönflies notation	$C_{nv}$	$C_{1v}$	$C_{2v}$	$C_{3v}$	$C_{4v}$	$C_{5v}$	$C_{6v}$
Symmetry (order $2n$)	Orbifold notation	$(*nn)$	$(*11)$	$(*22)$	$(*33)$	$(*44)$	$(*55)$	$(*66)$
Symmetry (order $2n$)	Coxeter diagram							
Symmetry (order $2n$)	Coxeter diagram	$[n]$	$[\,\,]$	$[2]$	$[3]$	$[4]$	$[5]$	$[6]$
$2n$-gonal hosohedron	Schläfli symbol	$\{2,2n\}$	$\{2,2\}$	$\{2,4\}$	$\{2,6\}$	$\{2,8\}$	$\{2,10\}$	$\{2,12\}$
$2n$-gonal hosohedron	Alternately colored fundamental domains							

== Relationship with the Steinmetz solid ==
The tetragonal hosohedron is topologically equivalent to the bicylinder Steinmetz solid, the intersection of two cylinders at right-angles.

== Derivative polyhedra ==
The dual of the n-gonal hosohedron {2, n} is the n-gonal dihedron, {n, 2}. The polyhedron {2,2} is self-dual, and is both a hosohedron and a dihedron.

A hosohedron may be modified in the same manner as the other polyhedra to produce a truncated variation. The truncated n-gonal hosohedron is the n-gonal prism.

== Apeirogonal hosohedron ==
In the limit, the hosohedron becomes an apeirogonal hosohedron as a 2-dimensional tessellation:

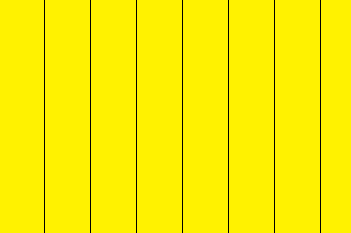

== Hosotopes ==
Multidimensional analogues in general are called hosotopes. A regular hosotope with Schläfli symbol {2,p,...,q} has two vertices, each with a vertex figure {p,...,q}.

The two-dimensional hosotope, {2}, is a digon.

== Etymology ==
The term “hosohedron” appears to derive from the Greek ὅσος (hosos) “as many”, the idea being that a hosohedron can have “as many faces as desired”. It was introduced by Vito Caravelli in the eighteenth century.

== See also ==
- Polyhedron
- Polytope
