= Apeirogonal tiling =

In geometry, an apeirogonal tiling is a tessellation of the Euclidean plane, hyperbolic plane, or some other two-dimensional space by apeirogons. Tilings of this type include:

- Order-2 apeirogonal tiling, Euclidean tiling of two half-spaces
- Order-3 apeirogonal tiling, hyperbolic tiling with 3 apeirogons around a vertex
- Order-4 apeirogonal tiling, hyperbolic tiling with 4 apeirogons around a vertex
- Order-5 apeirogonal tiling, hyperbolic tiling with 5 apeirogons around a vertex
- Infinite-order apeirogonal tiling, hyperbolic tiling with an infinite number of apeirogons around a vertex

The vertices of an order-$k$ apeirogonal tiling form a Bethe lattice, a regular infinite tree.

== See also ==
- Apeirogonal antiprism
- Apeirogonal prism
- Apeirohedron
