= Zigzag =

Pattern like a row of Ws joined together

Drawing of a zigzag

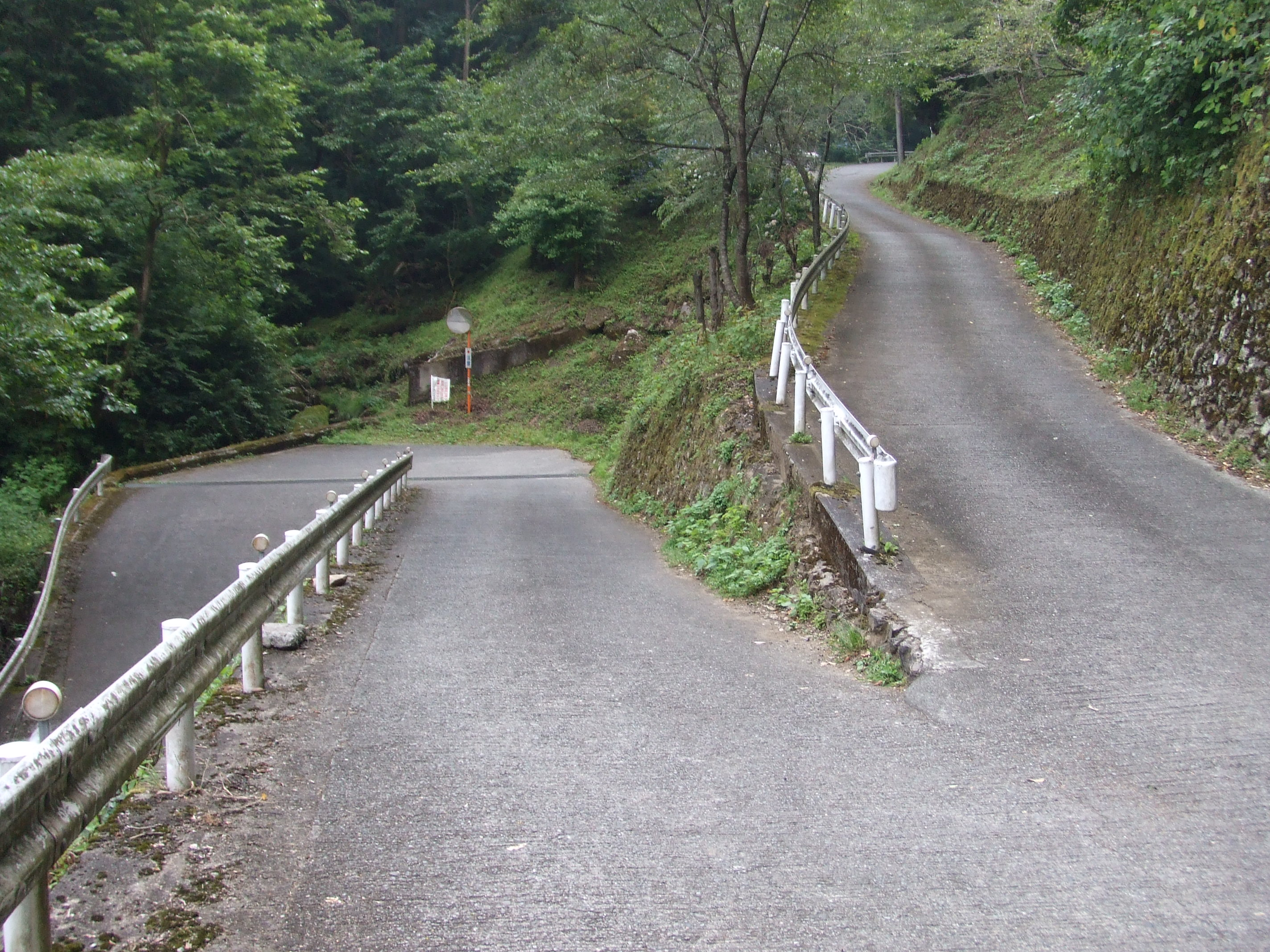
A road in Akiruno, Japan designed with switchbacks

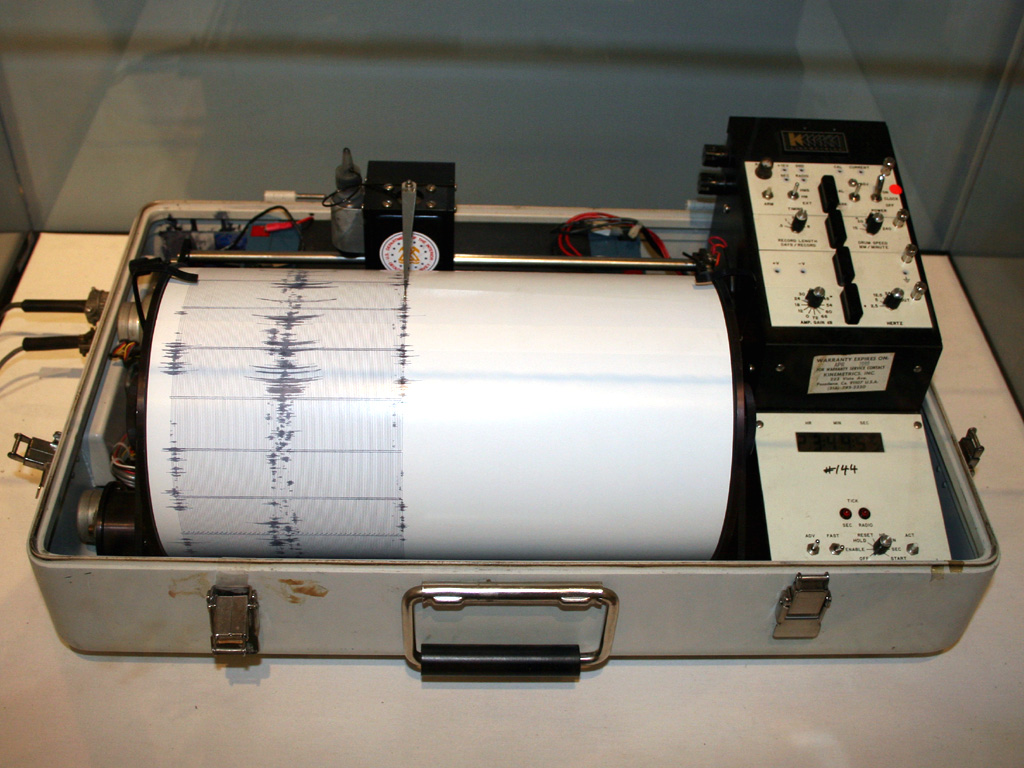
A seismograph showing zigzag lines

A zigzag is a pattern like a row of Ws joined together, consisting of a single line made up of line segments of usually constant length joined by usually constant angles in alternating directions.

In geometry, this pattern is described as a skew apeirogon. From the point of view of symmetry, a regular zigzag can be generated from a simple motif like a line segment by repeated application of a glide reflection.

Although the origin of the word is unclear, its first printed appearances were in French-language books and ephemera of the late 17th century.

== Examples of zigzags ==
- In civil engineering, a switchback is a technique used since antiquity — in places including Machu Picchu — to build a road or path along steep terrain by zigzagging laterally across a slope.
- The trace of a triangle wave or a sawtooth wave is a zigzag.
- Pinking shears are designed to cut cloth or paper with a zigzag edge, to lessen fraying.
- In sewing, a zigzag stitch is a machine stitch in a zigzag pattern.
- The zigzag arch is an architectural embellishment used in Islamic, Byzantine, Norman and Romanesque architecture.
- In seismology, earthquakes recorded in a "zigzag line" form by using seismograph.

== See also ==
- Serpentine shape
- Infinite skew polygon

== Bibliography ==
- Wedgwood, Hensleigh (1855). "On Roots mutually connected by reference to the term Zig-zag". Transactions of the Philological Society (2).
