= Digon =

Polygon with 2 sides and 2 vertices

Regular digon
- On a circle, a digon is a tessellation with two antipodal points, and two 180° arc edges.
- Type: Regular polygon
- Edges and vertices: 2
- Schläfli symbol: {2}
- Symmetry group: D_{2}, [2], (*2•)
- Internal angle (degrees): 0° (convex)
- Dual polygon: Self-dual

In geometry, a bigon, digon, or a 2-gon, is a polygon with two sides (edges) and two vertices. Its construction is degenerate in a Euclidean plane because either the two sides would coincide or one or both would have to be curved; however, it can be easily visualised in elliptic space. It may also be viewed as a representation of a graph with two vertices, see "Generalized polygon".

A regular digon has both angles equal and both sides equal and is represented by Schläfli symbol {2}. It may be constructed on a sphere as a pair of 180 degree arcs connecting antipodal points, when it forms a lune.

The digon is the simplest abstract polytope of rank 2.

A truncated digon, t{2} is a square, {4}. An alternated digon, h{2} is a monogon, {1}.

== In different fields ==
=== In Euclidean geometry ===
The digon can have one of two visual representations if placed in Euclidean space.

One representation is degenerate, and visually appears as a double-covering of a line segment. Appearing when the minimum distance between the two edges is 0, this form arises in several situations. This double-covering form is sometimes used for defining degenerate cases of some other polytopes; for example, a regular tetrahedron can be seen as an antiprism formed of such a digon. It can be derived from the alternation of a square (h{4}), as it requires two opposing vertices of said square to be connected. When higher-dimensional polytopes involving squares or other tetragonal figures are alternated, these digons are usually discarded and considered single edges.

A second visual representation, infinite in size, is as two parallel lines stretching to (and projectively meeting at; i.e. having vertices at) infinity, arising when the shortest distance between the two edges is greater than zero. This form arises in the representation of some degenerate polytopes, a notable example being the apeirogonal hosohedron, the limit of a general spherical hosohedron at infinity, composed of an infinite number of digons meeting at two antipodal points at infinity. However, as the vertices of these digons are at infinity and hence are not bound by closed line segments, this tessellation is usually not considered to be an additional regular tessellation of the Euclidean plane, even when its dual order-2 apeirogonal tiling (infinite dihedron) is.

A compound of two "line segment" digons, as the two possible alternations of a square (note the vertex arrangement).

The apeirogonal hosohedron, containing infinitely narrow digons.

Any straight-sided digon is regular even though it is degenerate, because its two edges are the same length and its two angles are equal (both being zero degrees). As such, the regular digon is a constructible polygon.

Some definitions of a polygon do not consider the digon to be a proper polygon because of its degeneracy in the Euclidean case.

=== In elementary polyhedra ===
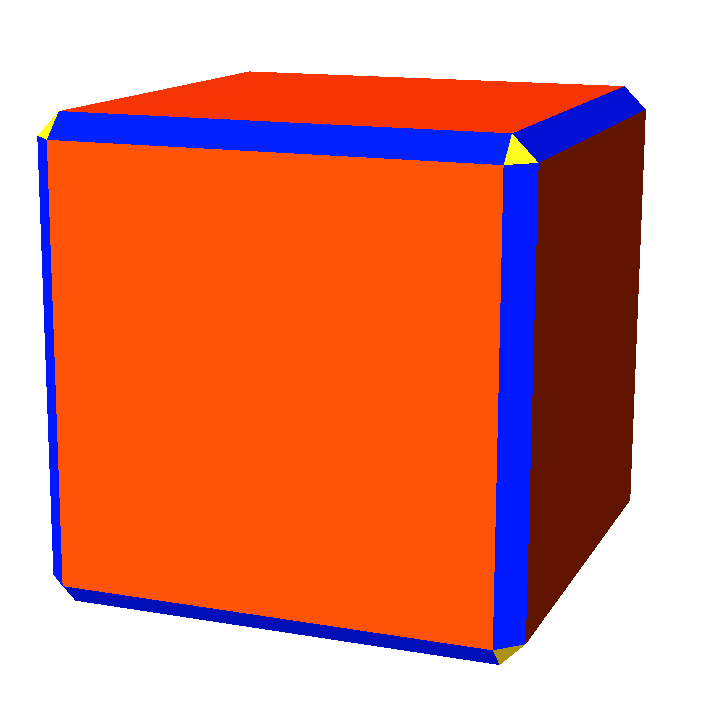
A nonuniform rhombicuboctahedron with blue rectangular faces that degenerate into digons in the cubic limit.

A digon as a face of a polyhedron is degenerate because it is a degenerate polygon, but sometimes it can have a useful topological existence in transforming polyhedra.

=== As a spherical lune ===
A spherical lune is a digon whose two vertices are antipodal points on the sphere.

A spherical polyhedron constructed from such digons is called a hosohedron.

A lune on the sphere.

Six digon faces on a regular hexagonal hosohedron.

=== In topological structures ===
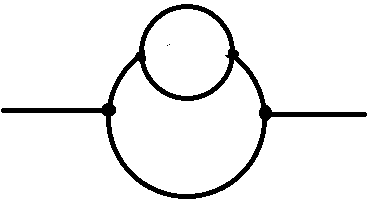
Bibigon: Insertion of a digon into a digon

Digons (bigons) may be used in constructing and analyzing various topological structures, such as incidence structures.

== See also ==
- Monogon
- Polygon
- Demihypercube
