= Apeirogon =

Polygon with an infinite number of sides

Apeirogon (regular)
- Edges and vertices: ∞
- Schläfli symbol: {∞}
- Internal angle (degrees): 180°
- Dual polygon: Self-dual

A partition of the Euclidean line into infinitely many equal-length segments can be understood as a regular apeirogon.

In geometry, an apeirogon (from Ancient Greek ἄπειροv apeiron 'infinite, boundless' and γωνία gonia 'angle') or infinite polygon is a polygon with an infinite number of sides. Apeirogons are the rank-2 case of infinite polytopes. In some literature, the term "apeirogon" may refer only to the regular apeirogon, with an infinite dihedral group of symmetries.

== Definitions ==
=== Geometric apeirogon ===
Given a point A_{0} in a Euclidean space and a translation S, define the point A_{i} to be the point obtained from i applications of the translation S to A_{0}, so A_{i} = S^{i}(A_{0}). The set of vertices A_{i} with i any integer, together with edges connecting adjacent vertices, is a sequence of equal-length segments of a line, and is called the regular apeirogon as defined by H. S. M. Coxeter.

A regular apeirogon can be defined as a partition of the Euclidean line E^{1} into infinitely many equal-length segments. It generalizes the regular n-gon, which may be defined as a partition of the circle S^{1} into finitely many equal-length segments.

=== Hyperbolic pseudogon ===
The regular pseudogon is a partition of the hyperbolic line H^{1} (instead of the Euclidean line) into segments of length 2λ, as an analogue of the regular apeirogon.

=== Abstract apeirogon ===
An abstract polytope is a partially ordered set P (whose elements are called faces) with properties modeling those of the inclusions of faces of convex polytopes. The rank (or dimension) of an abstract polytope is determined by the length of the maximal ordered chains of its faces, and an abstract polytope of rank n is called an abstract n-polytope.

For abstract polytopes of rank 2, this means that: A) the elements of the partially ordered set are sets of vertices with either zero vertex (the empty set), one vertex, two vertices (an edge), or the entire vertex set (a two-dimensional face), ordered by inclusion of sets; B) each vertex belongs to exactly two edges; C) the undirected graph formed by the vertices and edges is connected.

An abstract polytope is called an abstract apeirotope if it has infinitely many elements; an abstract 2-apeirotope is called an abstract apeirogon.

A realization of an abstract polytope is a mapping of its vertices to points of a geometric space (typically a Euclidean space). A faithful realization is a realization such that the vertex mapping is injective. (Note: McMullen & Schulte (2002) provide a stricter definition, requiring that the induced maps on higher rank faces be injective as well. However a regular polytope is either degenerate in which case it has no faithful realizations, or every vertex-faithful realization is faithful. The apeirogon is not degenerate and thus this condition is sufficient to show its realizations are faithful.) Every geometric apeirogon is a realization of the abstract apeirogon.

== Symmetries ==
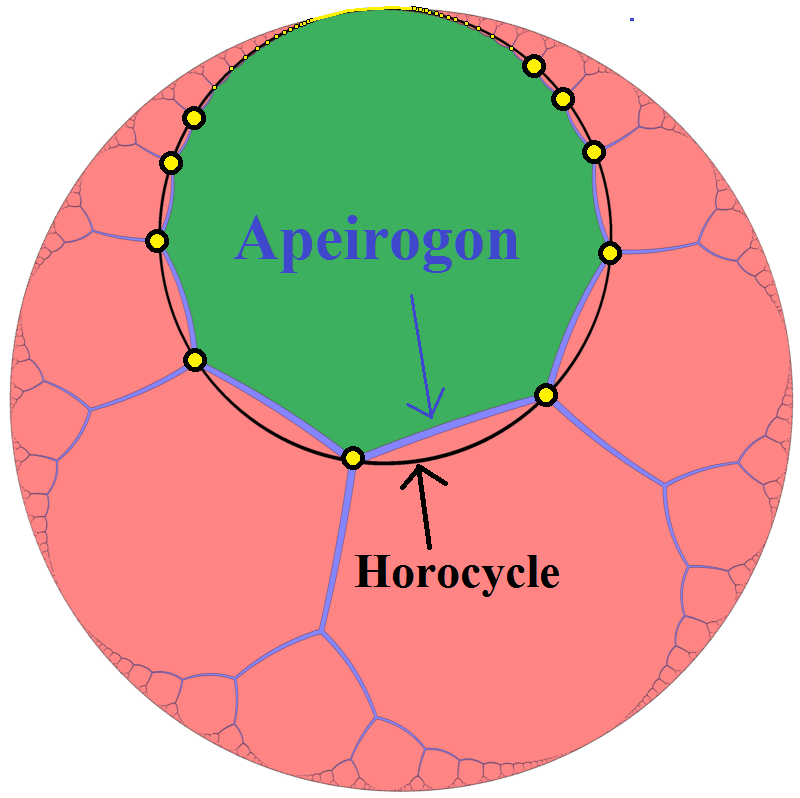
The order-3 apeirogonal tiling, {∞,3}, fills the hyperbolic plane with apeirogons whose vertices lie along horocyclic paths.

The infinite dihedral group G of symmetries of a regular geometric apeirogon is generated by two reflections, the product of which translates each vertex of P to the next. The product of the two reflections can be decomposed as a product of a non-zero translation, finitely many rotations, and a possibly trivial reflection.

In an abstract polytope, a flag is a collection of one face of each dimension, all incident to each other (that is, comparable in the partial order); an abstract polytope is called regular if it has symmetries (structure-preserving permutations of its elements) that take any flag to any other flag. In the case of a two-dimensional abstract polytope, this is automatically true; the symmetries of the apeirogon form the infinite dihedral group.

A symmetric realization of an abstract apeirogon is defined as a mapping from its vertices to a finite-dimensional geometric space (typically a Euclidean space) such that every symmetry of the abstract apeirogon corresponds to an isometry of the images of the mapping.

== Moduli space ==
Generally, the moduli space of a faithful realization of an abstract polytope is a convex cone of infinite dimension. The realization cone of the abstract apeirogon has uncountably infinite algebraic dimension and cannot be closed in the Euclidean topology.

== Classification of Euclidean apeirogons ==
The symmetric realization of any regular polygon in Euclidean space of dimension greater than 2 is reducible, meaning it can be made as a blend of two lower-dimensional polygons. This characterization of the regular polygons naturally characterizes the regular apeirogons as well. The discrete apeirogons are the results of blending the 1-dimensional apeirogon with other polygons. Since every polygon is a quotient of the apeirogon, the blend of any polygon with an apeirogon produces another apeirogon.

In two dimensions the discrete regular apeirogons are the infinite zigzag polygons, resulting from the blend of the 1-dimensional apeirogon with the digon, represented with the Schläfli symbol {∞}#{2}, {∞}#{}, or $\left\{\dfrac{2}{0,1}\right\}$.

In three dimensions the discrete regular apeirogons are the infinite helical polygons, with vertices spaced evenly along a helix. These are the result of blending the 1-dimensional apeirogon with a 2-dimensional polygon, {∞}#{p/q} or $\left\{\dfrac{p}{0,q}\right\}$.

== Generalizations ==
=== Higher rank ===
Apeirohedra are the rank 3 analogues of apeirogons, and are the infinite analogues of polyhedra. More generally, n-apeirotopes or infinite n-polytopes are the n-dimensional analogues of apeirogons, and are the infinite analogues of n-polytopes.

== See also ==
- Apeirogonal tiling
- Apeirogonal prism
- Apeirogonal antiprism
- Teragon, a fractal generalized polygon that also has infinitely many sides
