= Bethe lattice =

Regular infinite tree structure used in statistical mechanics

A Bethe lattice with coordination number z = 3

In statistical mechanics and mathematics, the Bethe lattice (also called a regular tree) is an infinite symmetric regular tree where all vertices have the same number of neighbors. The Bethe lattice was introduced into the physics literature by Hans Bethe in 1935. In such a graph, each node is connected to z neighbors; the number z is called either the coordination number or the degree, depending on the field.

Due to its distinctive topological structure, the statistical mechanics of lattice models on this graph are often easier to solve than on other lattices. The solutions are related to the often used Bethe ansatz for these systems.

== Basic properties ==
When working with the Bethe lattice, it is often convenient to mark a given vertex as the root, to be used as a reference point when considering local properties of the graph.

=== Sizes of layers ===
Once a vertex is marked as the root, we can group the other vertices into layers based on their distance from the root. The number of vertices at a distance $d>0$ from the root is $z(z-1)^{d-1}$, as each vertex other than the root is adjacent to $z-1$ vertices at a distance one greater from the root, and the root is adjacent to $z$ vertices at a distance 1.

== In statistical mechanics ==
The Bethe lattice is of interest in statistical mechanics mainly because lattice models on the Bethe lattice are often easier to solve than on other lattices, such as the two-dimensional square lattice. This is because the lack of cycles removes some of the more complicated interactions. While the Bethe lattice does not as closely approximate the interactions in physical materials as other lattices, it can still provide useful insight.

=== Exact solutions to the Ising model ===
The Ising model is a mathematical model of ferromagnetism, in which the magnetic properties of a material are represented by a "spin" at each node in the lattice, which is either +1 or -1. The model is also equipped with a constant $K$ representing the strength of the interaction between adjacent nodes, and a constant $h$ representing an external magnetic field.

The Ising model on the Bethe lattice is defined by the partition function

$$Z=\sum_{\{\sigma\}}\exp\left(K\sum_{(i,j)}\sigma_i\sigma_j + h\sum_i \sigma_i\right).$$

==== Magnetization ====
In order to compute the local magnetization, we can break the lattice up into several identical parts by removing a vertex. This gives us a recurrence relation which allows us to compute the magnetization of a Cayley tree with n shells (the finite analog to the Bethe lattice) as

$$M=\frac{e^h-e^{-h}x_n^q}{e^h+e^{-h}x_n^q},$$

where $x_0=1$ and the values of $x_i$ satisfy the recurrence relation

$$x_n=\frac{e^{-K+h}+e^{K-h}x_{n-1}^{q-1}}{e^{K+h}+e^{-K-h}x_{n-1}^{q-1}}$$

In the $K>0$ case when the system is ferromagnetic, the above sequence converges, so we may take the limit to evaluate the magnetization on the Bethe lattice. We get

$M=\frac{e^{2h}-x^q}{e^{2h}+x^q},$ where x is a solution to $x=\frac{e^{-K+h}+e^{K-h}x^{q-1}}{e^{K+h}+e^{-K-h}x^{q-1}}$.

There are either 1 or 3 solutions to this equation. In the case where there are 3, the sequence $x_n$ will converge to the smallest when $h>0$ and the largest when $h<0$.

==== Free energy ====
The free energy f at each site of the lattice in the Ising Model is given by

$$\frac{f}{kT}=\frac12[-Kq-q\ln(1-z^2)+\ln(z^2+1-z(x+1/x))+(q-2)\ln(x+1/x-2z)]$$,

where $z=\exp(-2K)$ and $x$ is as before.

== In mathematics ==
=== Return probability of a random walk ===
The probability that a random walk on a Bethe lattice of degree $z$ starting at a given vertex eventually returns to that vertex is given by $\frac{1}{z-1}$. To show this, let $P(k)$ be the probability of returning to our starting point if we are a distance $k$ away. We have the recurrence relation

$$P(k)=\frac1zP(k-1)+\frac{z-1}zP(k+1)$$

for all $k\ge1$, as at each location other than the starting vertex there are $z-1$ edges going away from the starting vertex and 1 edge going towards it. Summing this equation over all $k\ge1$, we get

$$\sum_{k=1}^{\infty}P(k)=\frac1zP(0)+\frac1zP(1)+\sum_{k=2}^{\infty}P(k)$$.

We have $P(0)=1$, as this indicates that we have just returned to the starting vertex, so $P(1)=1/(z-1)$, which is the value we want.

Note that this in stark contrast to the case of random walks on the two-dimensional square lattice, which famously has a return probability of 1. Such a lattice is 4-regular, but the 4-regular Bethe lattice has a return probability of 1/3.

=== Number of closed walks ===
One can easily bound the number of closed walks of length $2k$ starting at a given vertex of the Bethe Lattice with degree $z$ from below. By considering each step as either an outward step (away from the starting vertex) or an inward step (toward the starting vertex), we see that any closed walk of length $2k$ must have exactly $k$ outward steps and $k$ inward steps. We also may not have taken more inward steps than outward steps at any point, so the number of sequences of step directions (either inward or outward) is given by the $k$th Catalan number $C_k$. There are at least $z-1$ choices for each outward step, and always exactly 1 choice for each inward step, so the number of closed walks is at least $(z-1)^kC_k$.

This bound is not tight, as there are actually $z$ choices for an outward step from the starting vertex, which happens at the beginning and any number of times during the walk. The exact number of walks is trickier to compute, and is given by the formula

$$(z-1)^kC_k\cdot \frac{z-1}{z}\ _2F_1(k+1/2,1,k+2,4(z-1)/z^2),$$

where $_2F_1(\alpha,\beta,\gamma,z)$ is the Gauss hypergeometric function.

We may use this fact to bound the second largest eigenvalue of a $d$-regular graph. Let $G$ be a $d$-regular graph with $n$ vertices, and let $A$ be its adjacency matrix. Then $\text{tr }A^{2k}$ is the number of closed walks of length $2k$. The number of closed walks on $G$ is at least $n$ times the number of closed walks on the Bethe lattice with degree $d$ starting at a particular vertex, as we can map the walks on the Bethe lattice to the walks on $G$ that start at a given vertex and only go back on paths that were already tread. There are often more walks on $G$, as we can make use of cycles to create additional walks. The largest eigenvalue of $A$ is $d$, and letting $\lambda_2$ be the second largest absolute value of an eigenvalue, we have

$$n(d-1)^kC_k\le\text{tr} A^{2k}\le d^{2k}+(n-1)\lambda_2^{2k}.$$

This gives $\lambda_2^{2k}\ge\frac{1}{n-1}(n(d-1)^kC_k-d^{2k})$. Noting that $C_k=(4-o(1))^k$ as $k$ grows, we can let $n$ grow much faster than $k$ to see that there are only finitely many $d$-regular graphs $G$ for which the second largest absolute value of an eigenvalue is at most $\lambda$, for any $\lambda < 2\sqrt{d-1}.$ This is a rather interesting result in the study of (n,d,λ)-graphs.

=== Relation to Cayley graphs and Cayley trees ===
A Bethe graph of even coordination number 2n is isomorphic to the unoriented Cayley graph of a free group of rank n with respect to a free generating set.

=== Lattices in Lie groups ===
Bethe lattices also occur as the discrete subgroups of certain hyperbolic Lie groups, such as the Fuchsian groups. As such, they are also lattices in the sense of a lattice in a Lie group.

=== Hyperbolic geometry ===
The order-3 apeirogonal tiling

The vertices and edges of an order-$k$ apeirogonal tiling of the hyperbolic plane form a Bethe lattice of degree $k$.

== See also ==
- Crystal
