= Opposite direction =

Opposite direction may mean:

- Opposite Direction, a film
- The Opposite Direction, a TV show
- Opposite direction (geometry), a vector
- Compass directionss 180-degree apart
- Inverse geodesics on an ellipsoid
- A 180-degree rotation
- A point reflection
