= Infinite skew polygon =

Non-planar polygon with infinitely many sides

In geometry, an infinite skew polygon or skew apeirogon is an infinite 2-polytope with vertices that are not all colinear. Infinite zig-zag skew polygons are 2-dimensional infinite skew polygons with vertices alternating between two parallel lines. Infinite helical polygons are 3-dimensional infinite skew polygons with vertices on the surface of a cylinder.

Regular infinite skew polygons exist in the Petrie polygons of the affine and hyperbolic Coxeter groups. They are constructed a single operator as the composite of all the reflections of the Coxeter group.

== Regular zig-zag skew apeirogons in two dimensions ==
Regular zig-zag skew apeirogon
- Edges and vertices: ∞
- Schläfli symbol: {∞}#{ }
- Symmetry group: D_{∞d}, [2^{+},∞], (2*∞)

The angled edges of an apeirogonal antiprism represent a regular zig-zag skew apeirogon.

A regular zig-zag skew apeirogon has (2*∞), D_{∞d} Frieze group symmetry.

Regular zig-zag skew apeirogons exist as Petrie polygons of the three regular tilings of the plane: {4,4}, {6,3}, and {3,6}. These regular zig-zag skew apeirogons have internal angles of 90°, 120°, and 60° respectively, from the regular polygons within the tilings:

Petrie polygons of the three regular tilings of the plane
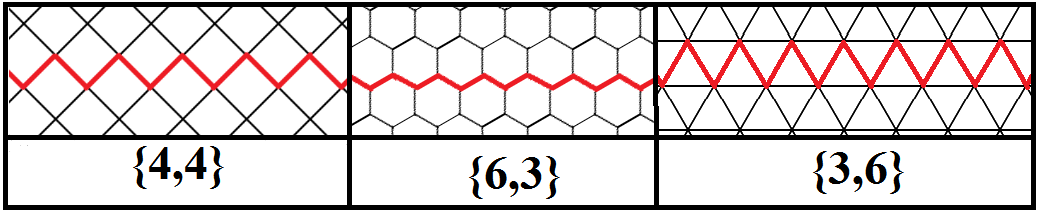

== Isotoxal skew apeirogons in two dimensions ==
An isotoxal apeirogon has one edge type, between two alternating vertex types. There's a degree of freedom in the internal angle, α. {∞_{α}} is the dual polygon of an isogonal skew apeirogon.

{∞_{0°}}
{∞_{30°}}

== Isogonal skew apeirogons in two dimensions ==
=== Isogonal zig-zag skew apeirogons in two dimensions ===
An isogonal skew apeirogon alternates two types of edges with various Frieze group symmetries. Distorted regular zig-zag skew apeirogons produce isogonal zig-zag skew apeirogons with translational symmetry:

p1, [∞]^{+}, (∞∞), C_{∞}

=== Isogonal elongated skew apeirogons in two dimensions ===
Other isogonal skew apeirogons have alternate edges parallel to the Frieze direction. These isogonal elongated skew apeirogons have vertical mirror symmetry in the midpoints of the edges parallel to the Frieze direction:

p2mg, [2^{+},∞], (2*∞), D_{∞d}

==== Quasiregular elongated skew apeirogons in two dimensions ====
An isogonal elongated skew apeirogon has two different edge types; if both of its edge types have the same length: it can't be called regular because its two edge types are still different ("trans-edge" and "cis-edge"), but it can be called quasiregular.

Example quasiregular elongated skew apeirogons can be seen as truncated Petrie polygons in truncated regular tilings of the Euclidean plane:

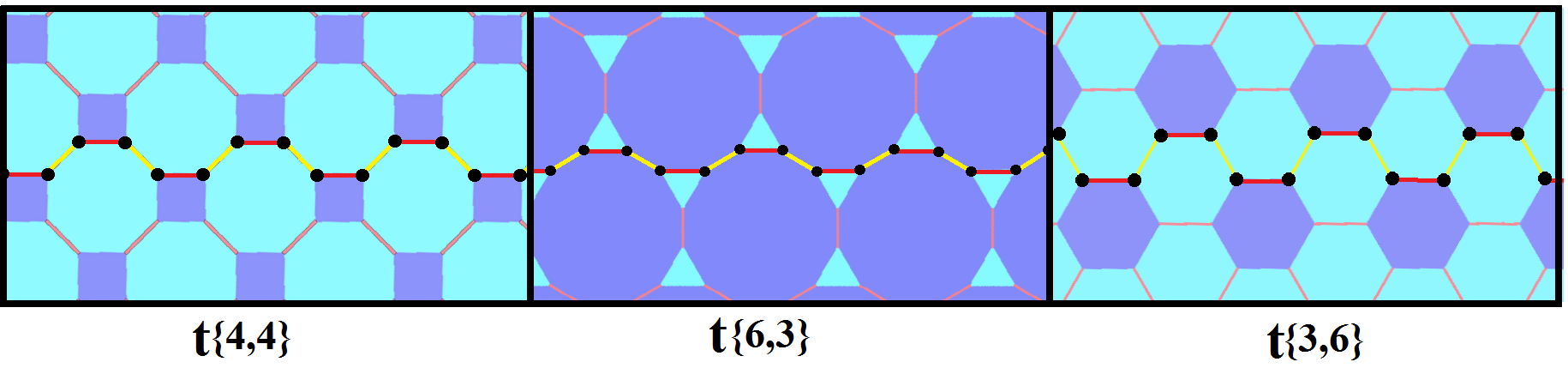

== Hyperbolic skew apeirogons ==
Infinite regular skew polygons are similarly found in the Euclidean plane and in the hyperbolic plane.

Hyperbolic infinite regular skew polygons also exist as Petrie polygons zig-zagging edge paths on all regular tilings of the hyperbolic plane. And again like in the Euclidean plane, hyperbolic infinite quasiregular skew polygons can be constructed as truncated Petrie polygons within the edges of all truncated regular tilings of the hyperbolic plane.

Regular and uniform tilings with infinite skew polygons in the hyperbolic plane
{3,7}	t{3,7}
Regular skew	Quasiregular skew

== Infinite helical polygons in three dimensions ==
A regular apeirogon in 3-dimensions
{∞} # {3}
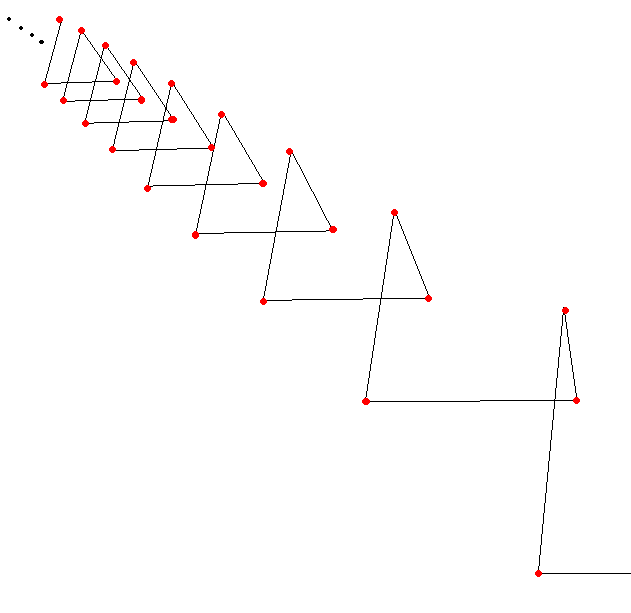
An infinite regular helical polygon
(drawn in perspective)

An infinite helical (skew) polygon can exist in three dimensions, where the vertices can be seen as limited to the surface of a cylinder. The sketch on the right is a 3D perspective view of such an infinite regular helical polygon.

This infinite helical polygon can be mostly seen as constructed from the vertices in an infinite stack of uniform n-gonal prisms or antiprisms, although in general the twist angle is not limited to an integer divisor of 180°. An infinite helical (skew) polygon has screw axis symmetry.

An infinite stack of prisms, for example cubes, contain an infinite helical polygon across the diagonals of the square faces, with a twist angle of 90° and with a Schläfli symbol {∞} # {4}.

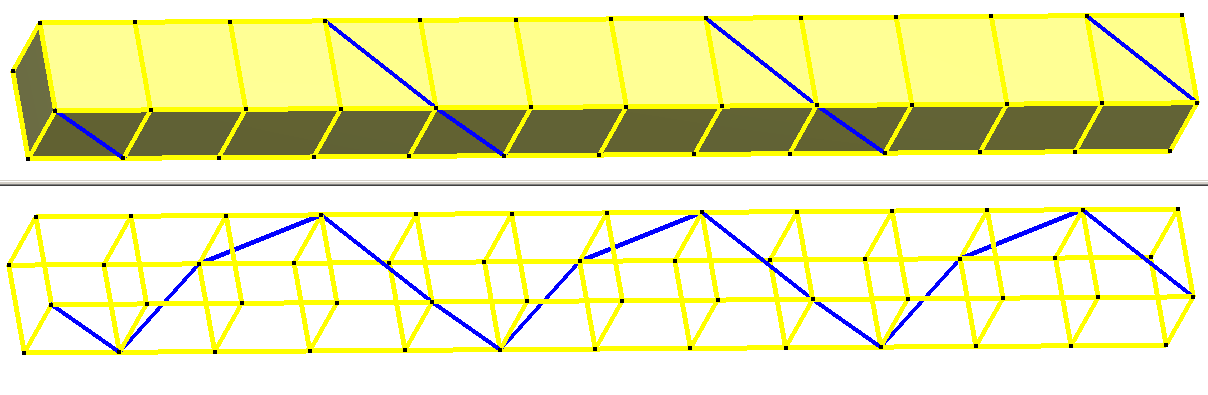

An infinite stack of antiprisms, for example octahedra, makes infinite helical polygons, 3 here highlighted in red, green, and blue, each with a twist angle of 60° and with a Schläfli symbol {∞} # {6}.

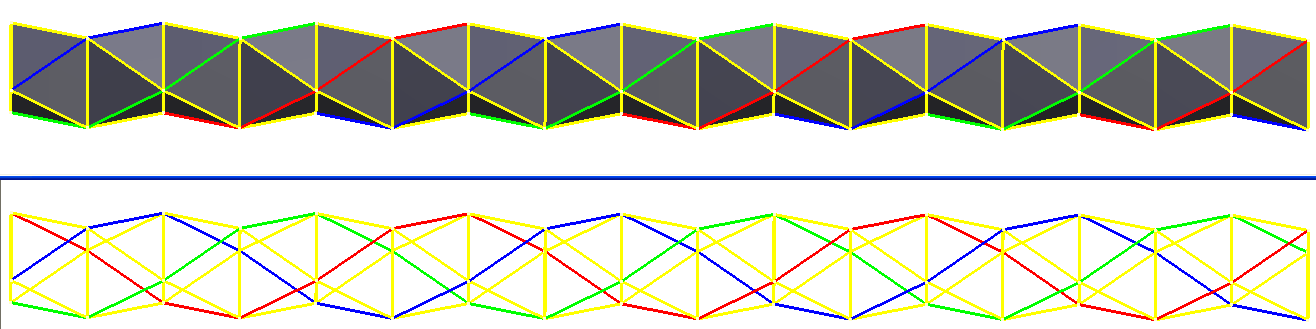

A sequence of edges of a Boerdijk–Coxeter helix can represent infinite regular helical polygons with an irrational twist angle:

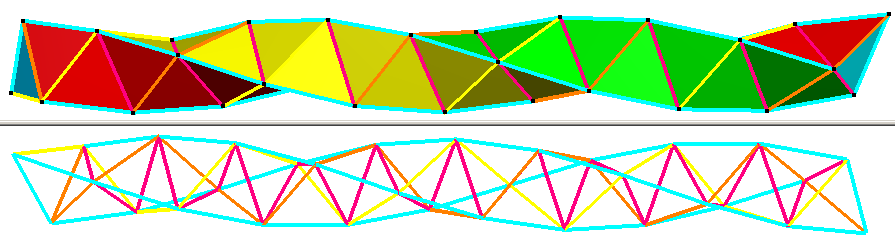

=== Infinite isogonal helical polygons in three dimensions ===
A stack of right prisms can generate isogonal helical apeirogons alternating edges around axis, and along axis; for example a stack of cubes can generate this isogonal helical apeirogon alternating red and blue edges:

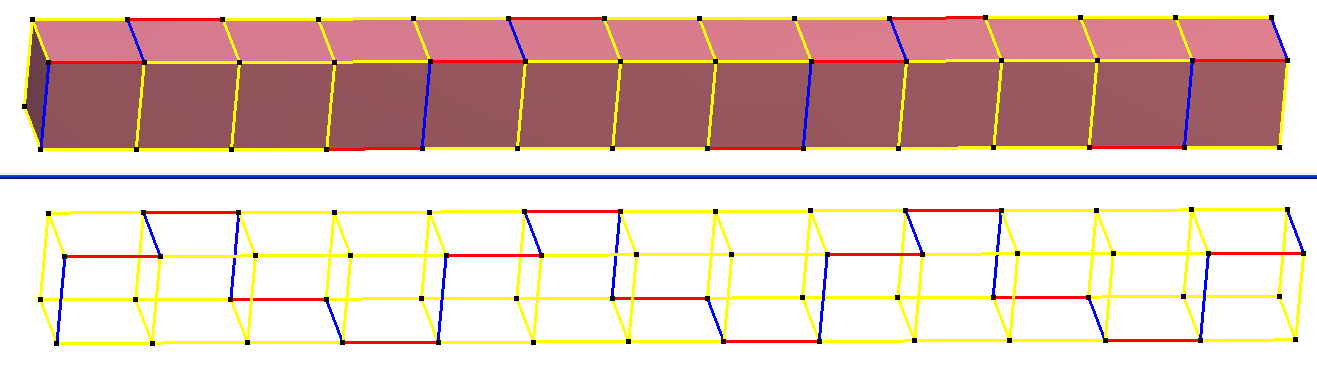

Similarly an alternating stack of prisms and antiprisms can produce an infinite isogonal helical polygon; for example, a triangular stack of prisms and antiprisms with an infinite isogonal helical polygon:

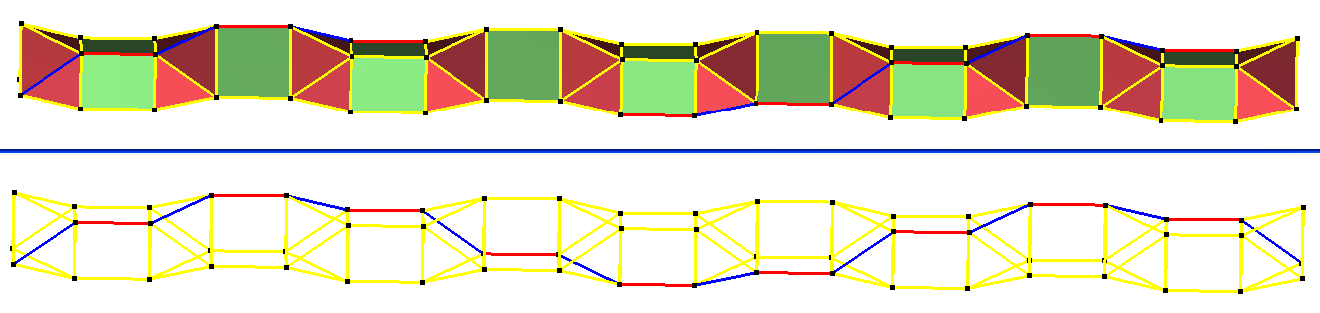

An infinite isogonal helical polygon with an irrational twist angle can also be constructed from truncated tetrahedra stacked like a Boerdijk–Coxeter helix, alternating two types of edges, between pairs of hexagonal faces and pairs of triangular faces:

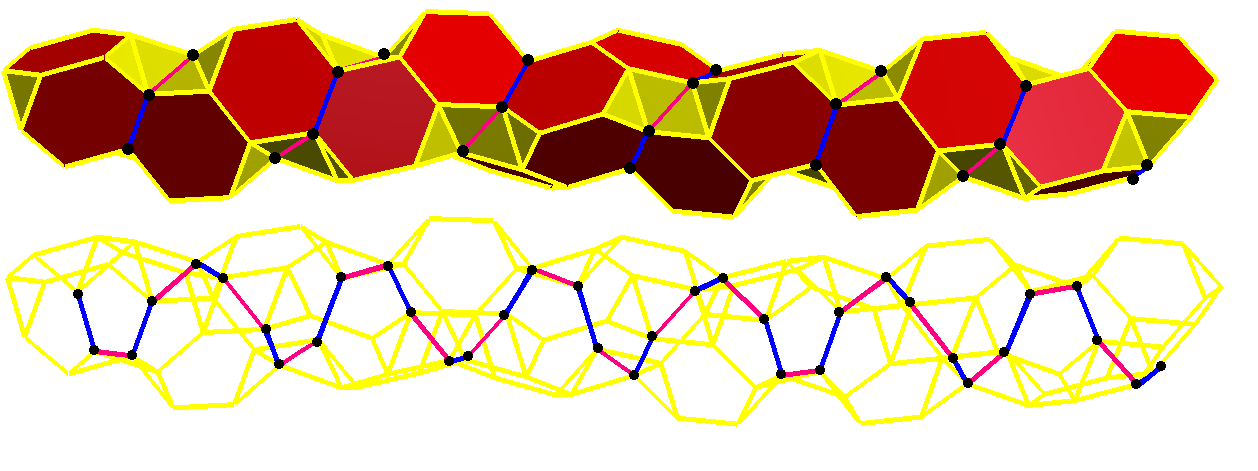
