= Monogon =

Polygon with one edge and one vertex

- On a circle, a monogon is a tessellation with a single vertex, and one 360-degree arc edge.
- Type: Regular polygon
- Edges and vertices: 1
- Schläfli symbol: {1} or h{2}
- Coxeter–Dynkin diagrams: or
- Symmetry group: [ ], C_{s}
- Dual polygon: Self-dual

In geometry, a monogon is a curve, considered by some as a polygon with one edge and one vertex. It has Schläfli symbol {1}.

== In Euclidean geometry ==
In Euclidean geometry a monogon is a degenerate polygon because its endpoints must coincide, unlike any Euclidean line segment. Most definitions of a polygon in Euclidean geometry do not admit the monogon.

== In spherical geometry ==
In spherical geometry, a monogon can be constructed as a vertex on a great circle (equator). This forms a dihedron, {1,2}, with two hemispherical monogonal faces which share one 360° edge and one vertex. Its dual, a hosohedron, {2,1} has two antipodal vertices at the poles, one 360° lune face, and one edge (meridian) between the two vertices.

Monogonal dihedron, {1,2}	Monogonal hosohedron, {2,1}

== See also ==
- Digon
