= Antipodal point =

Pair of diametrically opposite points on a circle, sphere, or hypersphere

The two points P and P' (red) are antipodal because they are ends of a diameter PP', a segment of the axis a (purple) passing through the sphere's center O (black). P and P' are the poles of a great circle g (green) whose points are equidistant from each (with a central right angle). Any great circle s (blue) passing through the poles is secondary to g.

In mathematics, two points of a sphere (or n-sphere, including a circle) are called antipodal or diametrically opposite if they are the endpoints of a diameter, a straight line segment between two points on a sphere and passing through its center.

Given any point on a sphere, its antipodal point is the unique point at greatest distance, whether measured intrinsically (great-circle distance on the surface of the sphere) or extrinsically (chordal distance through the sphere's interior). Every great circle on a sphere passing through a point also passes through its antipodal point, and there are infinitely many great circles passing through a pair of antipodal points (unlike the situation for any non-antipodal pair of points, which have a unique great circle passing through both). Many results in spherical geometry depend on choosing non-antipodal points, and degenerate if antipodal points are allowed; for example, a spherical triangle degenerates to an underspecified lune if two of the vertices are antipodal.

The point antipodal to a given point is called its antipodes, from the Greek ἀντίποδες (antípodes) meaning "opposite feet"; see Antipode (disambiguation) § Etymology. Sometimes the s is dropped, and this is rendered antipode, a back-formation.

== Higher mathematics ==
The concept of antipodal points is generalized to spheres of any dimension: two points on the sphere are antipodal if they are opposite through the centre. Each line through the centre intersects the sphere in two points, one for each ray emanating from the centre, and these two points are antipodal.

The Borsuk–Ulam theorem is a result from algebraic topology dealing with such pairs of points. It says that any continuous function from $S^n$ to $\R^n$ maps some pair of antipodal points in $S^n$ to the same point in $\R^n.$ Here, $S^n$ denotes the $n$-dimensional sphere and $\R^n$ is $n$-dimensional real coordinate space.

The antipodal map $A : S^n \to S^n$ sends every point on the sphere to its antipodal point. If points on the $n$-sphere are represented as displacement vectors from the sphere's center in Euclidean $(n+1)$-space, then two antipodal points are represented by additive inverses $\mathbf{v}$ and $-\mathbf{v},$ and the antipodal map can be defined as $A(\mathbf{x}) = -\mathbf{x}.$ The antipodal map preserves orientation (is homotopic to the identity map) when $n$ is odd, and reverses it when $n$ is even. Its degree is $(-1)^{n+1}.$

If antipodal points are identified (considered equivalent), the sphere becomes a model of real projective space.

== See also ==
- Cut locus
- Opposite direction
