= Order-2 apeirogonal tiling =

Plane tiling with two infinite-sided polygons

Apeirogonal tiling
Order-2 apeirogonal tiling
Type	Regular tiling
Vertex configuration	∞.∞
Face configuration	V2.2.2...
Schläfli symbol(s)	{∞,2}
Wythoff symbol(s)	2 | ∞ 2; 2 2 | ∞
Coxeter diagram(s)	
Symmetry	[∞,2], (*∞22)
Rotation symmetry	[∞,2]^{+}, (∞22)
Dual	Apeirogonal hosohedron
Properties	Vertex-transitive, edge-transitive, face-transitive

In geometry, an order-2 apeirogonal tiling, apeirogonal dihedron, or infinite dihedron is a tessellation (gap-free filling with repeated shapes) of the plane consisting of two apeirogons. It may be considered an improper regular tiling of the Euclidean plane, with Schläfli symbol {∞, 2}. Two apeirogons joined along all their edges can completely fill the entire plane, as an apeirogon is infinite in size and has an interior angle of 180°, which is half of a full 360°.

== Related tilings and polyhedra ==
Similarly to the uniform polyhedra and the uniform tilings, eight uniform tilings may be based from the regular apeirogonal tiling. The rectified and cantellated forms are duplicated, and as two times infinity is also infinity, the truncated and omnitruncated forms are also duplicated, therefore reducing the number of unique forms to four: the apeirogonal tiling, the apeirogonal hosohedron, the apeirogonal prism, and the apeirogonal antiprism.

Order-2 regular or uniform apeirogonal tilings
(∞ 2 2)	Wythoff symbol	Schläfli symbol	Coxeter diagram	Vertex config.	Tiling image	Tiling name
Parent	2 | ∞ 2	{∞,2}		∞.∞		Apeirogonal dihedron
Truncated	2 2 | ∞	t{∞,2}		2.∞.∞		Apeirogonal dihedron
Rectified	2 | ∞ 2	r{∞,2}		2.∞.2.∞		Apeirogonal dihedron
Birectified (dual)	∞ | 2 2	{2,∞}		2^{∞}		Apeirogonal hosohedron
Bitruncated	2 ∞ | 2	t{2,∞}		4.4.∞		Apeirogonal prism
Cantellated	∞ 2 | 2	rr{∞,2}		4.4.∞		Apeirogonal prism
Omnitruncated (Cantitruncated)	∞ 2 2 |	tr{∞,2}		4.4.∞		Apeirogonal prism
Snub	| ∞ 2 2	sr{∞,2}		3.3.3.∞		Apeirogonal antiprism

== See also ==
- Order-3 apeirogonal tiling - hyperbolic tiling
- Order-4 apeirogonal tiling - hyperbolic tiling
