= Apeirogonal hosohedron =

Geometric tiling of the plane

Apeirogonal hosohedron
Apeirogonal hosohedron
Type	Regular tiling
Vertex configuration	2^{∞}
Face configuration	V∞^{2}
Schläfli symbol(s)	{2,∞}
Wythoff symbol(s)	∞ | 2 2
Coxeter diagram(s)	
Symmetry	[∞,2], (*∞22)
Rotation symmetry	[∞,2]^{+}, (∞22)
Dual	Order-2 apeirogonal tiling
Properties	Vertex-transitive, edge-transitive, face-transitive

In geometry, an apeirogonal hosohedron or infinite hosohedron is a tiling of the plane consisting of two vertices at infinity. It may be considered an improper regular tiling of the Euclidean plane, with Schläfli symbol {2,∞}.

== Related tilings and polyhedra ==
The apeirogonal hosohedron is the arithmetic limit of the family of hosohedra {2,p}, as p tends to infinity, thereby turning the hosohedron into a Euclidean tiling. All the vertices have then receded to infinity and the digonal faces are no longer defined by closed circuits of finite edges.

Similarly to the uniform polyhedra and the uniform tilings, eight uniform tilings may be based from the regular apeirogonal tiling. The rectified and cantellated forms are duplicated, and as two times infinity is also infinity, the truncated and omnitruncated forms are also duplicated, therefore reducing the number of unique forms to four: the apeirogonal tiling, the apeirogonal hosohedron, the apeirogonal prism, and the apeirogonal antiprism.

Order-2 regular or uniform apeirogonal tilings
(∞ 2 2)	Wythoff symbol	Schläfli symbol	Coxeter diagram	Vertex config.	Tiling image	Tiling name
Parent	2 | ∞ 2	{∞,2}		∞.∞		Apeirogonal dihedron
Truncated	2 2 | ∞	t{∞,2}		2.∞.∞		Apeirogonal dihedron
Rectified	2 | ∞ 2	r{∞,2}		2.∞.2.∞		Apeirogonal dihedron
Birectified (dual)	∞ | 2 2	{2,∞}		2^{∞}		Apeirogonal hosohedron
Bitruncated	2 ∞ | 2	t{2,∞}		4.4.∞		Apeirogonal prism
Cantellated	∞ 2 | 2	rr{∞,2}		4.4.∞		Apeirogonal prism
Omnitruncated (Cantitruncated)	∞ 2 2 |	tr{∞,2}		4.4.∞		Apeirogonal prism
Snub	| ∞ 2 2	sr{∞,2}		3.3.3.∞		Apeirogonal antiprism
