= Order-6-3 square honeycomb =

Order-6-3 square honeycomb
Type	Regular honeycomb
Schläfli symbol	{4,6,3}
Coxeter diagram	
Cells	{4,6}
Faces	{4}
Vertex figure	{6,3}
Dual	{3,6,4}
Coxeter group	[4,6,3]
Properties	Regular

In the geometry of hyperbolic 3-space, the order-6-3 square honeycomb or 4,6,3 honeycomb is a regular space-filling tessellation (or honeycomb). Each infinite cell consists of a hexagonal tiling whose vertices lie on a 2-hypercycle, each of which has a limiting circle on the ideal sphere.

== Geometry ==
The Schläfli symbol of the order-6-3 square honeycomb is {4,6,3}, with three order-4 hexagonal tilings meeting at each edge. The vertex figure of this honeycomb is a hexagonal tiling, {6,3}.

Poincaré disk model	Ideal surface

== Related polytopes and honeycombs ==
It is a part of a series of regular polytopes and honeycombs with {p,6,3} Schläfli symbol, and dodecahedral vertex figures:

=== Order-6-3 pentagonal honeycomb ===
Order-6-3 pentagonal honeycomb
Type	Regular honeycomb
Schläfli symbol	{5,6,3}
Coxeter diagram	
Cells	{5,6}
Faces	{5}
Vertex figure	{6,3}
Dual	{3,6,5}
Coxeter group	[5,6,3]
Properties	Regular

In the geometry of hyperbolic 3-space, the order-6-3 pentagonal honeycomb or 5,6,3 honeycomb is a regular space-filling tessellation (or honeycomb). Each infinite cell consists of an order-6 pentagonal tiling whose vertices lie on a 2-hypercycle, each of which has a limiting circle on the ideal sphere.

The Schläfli symbol of the order-6-3 pentagonal honeycomb is {5,6,3}, with three order-6 pentagonal tilings meeting at each edge. The vertex figure of this honeycomb is a hexagonal tiling, {6,3}.

Poincaré disk model	Ideal surface

=== Order-6-3 hexagonal honeycomb ===
Order-6-3 hexagonal honeycomb
Type	Regular honeycomb
Schläfli symbol	{6,6,3}
Coxeter diagram	
Cells	{6,6}
Faces	{6}
Vertex figure	{6,3}
Dual	{3,6,6}
Coxeter group	[6,6,3]
Properties	Regular

In the geometry of hyperbolic 3-space, the order-6-3 hexagonal honeycomb or 6,6,3 honeycomb is a regular space-filling tessellation (or honeycomb). Each infinite cell consists of an order-6 hexagonal tiling whose vertices lie on a 2-hypercycle, each of which has a limiting circle on the ideal sphere.

The Schläfli symbol of the order-6-3 hexagonal honeycomb is {6,6,3}, with three order-5 hexagonal tilings meeting at each edge. The vertex figure of this honeycomb is a hexagonal tiling, {6,3}.

Poincaré disk model	Ideal surface

=== Order-6-3 apeirogonal honeycomb ===
Order-6-3 apeirogonal honeycomb
Type	Regular honeycomb
Schläfli symbol	{∞,6,3}
Coxeter diagram	
Cells	{∞,6}
Faces	Apeirogon {∞}
Vertex figure	{6,3}
Dual	{3,6,∞}
Coxeter group	[∞,6,3]
Properties	Regular

In the geometry of hyperbolic 3-space, the order-6-3 apeirogonal honeycomb or ∞,6,3 honeycomb is a regular space-filling tessellation (or honeycomb). Each infinite cell consists of an order-6 apeirogonal tiling whose vertices lie on a 2-hypercycle, each of which has a limiting circle on the ideal sphere.

The Schläfli symbol of the apeirogonal tiling honeycomb is {∞,6,3}, with three order-6 apeirogonal tilings meeting at each edge. The vertex figure of this honeycomb is a hexagonal tiling, {6,3}.

The "ideal surface" projection below is a plane-at-infinity, in the Poincaré half-space model of H3. It shows an Apollonian gasket pattern of circles inside a largest circle.

Poincaré disk model	Ideal surface

== See also ==
- Convex uniform honeycombs in hyperbolic space
- List of regular polytopes
