= Order-6-4 triangular honeycomb =

Order-6-4 triangular honeycomb
Type	Regular honeycomb
Schläfli symbols	{3,6,4}
Coxeter diagrams	=
Cells	{3,6}
Faces	{3}
Edge figure	{4}
Vertex figure	{6,4} r{6,6}
Dual	{4,6,3}
Coxeter group	[3,6,4]
Properties	Regular

In the geometry of hyperbolic 3-space, the order-6-4 triangular honeycomb is a regular space-filling tessellation (or honeycomb) with Schläfli symbol {3,6,4}.

== Geometry ==
It has four triangular tiling {3,6} around each edge. All vertices are ultra-ideal (existing beyond the ideal boundary) with infinitely many triangular tilings existing around each vertex in an order-4 hexagonal tiling vertex arrangement.

Poincaré disk model	Ideal surface

It has a second construction as a uniform honeycomb, Schläfli symbol {3,6^{1,1}}, Coxeter diagram,, with alternating types or colors of triangular tiling cells. In Coxeter notation the half symmetry is [3,6,4,1^{+}] = [3,6^{1,1}].

== Related polytopes and honeycombs ==
It a part of a sequence of regular polychora and honeycombs with triangular tiling cells: {3,6,p}

{3,6,p} polytopes
Space	H^{3}				
Form	Paracompact	Noncompact			
Name	{3,6,3}	{3,6,4}	{3,6,5}	{3,6,6}	... {3,6,∞}
Image					
Vertex figure	{6,3}	{6,4}	{6,5}	{6,6}	{6,∞}

=== Order-6-5 triangular honeycomb ===
Order-6-5 triangular honeycomb
Type	Regular honeycomb
Schläfli symbol	{3,6,5}
Coxeter diagram	
Cells	{3,6}
Faces	{3}
Edge figure	{5}
Vertex figure	{6,5}
Dual	{5,6,3}
Coxeter group	[3,6,5]
Properties	Regular

In the geometry of hyperbolic 3-space, the order-6-3 triangular honeycomb is a regular space-filling tessellation (or honeycomb) with Schläfli symbol {3,6,5}. It has five triangular tiling, {3,6}, around each edge. All vertices are ultra-ideal (existing beyond the ideal boundary) with infinitely many triangular tilings existing around each vertex in an order-5 hexagonal tiling vertex arrangement.

Poincaré disk model	Ideal surface

=== Order-6-6 triangular honeycomb ===
Order-6-6 triangular honeycomb
Type	Regular honeycomb
Schläfli symbols	{3,6,6} {3,(6,3,6)}
Coxeter diagrams	=
Cells	{3,6}
Faces	{3}
Edge figure	{6}
Vertex figure	{6,6} {(6,3,6)}
Dual	{6,6,3}
Coxeter group	[3,6,6] [3,((6,3,6))]
Properties	Regular

In the geometry of hyperbolic 3-space, the order-6-6 triangular honeycomb is a regular space-filling tessellation (or honeycomb) with Schläfli symbol {3,6,6}. It has infinitely many triangular tiling, {3,6}, around each edge. All vertices are ultra-ideal (existing beyond the ideal boundary) with infinitely many triangular tilings existing around each vertex in an order-6 triangular tiling vertex arrangement.

Poincaré disk model	Ideal surface

It has a second construction as a uniform honeycomb, Schläfli symbol {3,(6,3,6)}, Coxeter diagram, =, with alternating types or colors of triangular tiling cells. In Coxeter notation the half symmetry is [3,6,6,1^{+}] = [3,((6,3,6))].

=== Order-6-infinite triangular honeycomb ===
Order-6-infinite triangular honeycomb
Type	Regular honeycomb
Schläfli symbols	{3,6,∞} {3,(6,∞,6)}
Coxeter diagrams	=
Cells	{3,6}
Faces	{3}
Edge figure	{∞}
Vertex figure	{6,∞} {(6,∞,6)}
Dual	{∞,6,3}
Coxeter group	[∞,6,3] [3,((6,∞,6))]
Properties	Regular

In the geometry of hyperbolic 3-space, the order-6-infinite triangular honeycomb is a regular space-filling tessellation (or honeycomb) with Schläfli symbol {3,6,∞}. It has infinitely many triangular tiling, {3,6}, around each edge. All vertices are ultra-ideal (existing beyond the ideal boundary) with infinitely many triangular tilings existing around each vertex in an infinite-order triangular tiling vertex arrangement.

Poincaré disk model	Ideal surface

It has a second construction as a uniform honeycomb, Schläfli symbol {3,(6,∞,6)}, Coxeter diagram, =, with alternating types or colors of triangular tiling cells. In Coxeter notation the half symmetry is [3,6,∞,1^{+}] = [3,((6,∞,6))].

== See also ==
- Convex uniform honeycombs in hyperbolic space
- List of regular polytopes
