= Order-5-3 square honeycomb =

Order-5-3 square honeycomb
Type	Regular honeycomb
Schläfli symbol	{4,5,3}
Coxeter diagram	
Cells	{4,5}
Faces	{4}
Vertex figure	{5,3}
Dual	{3,5,4}
Coxeter group	[4,5,3]
Properties	Regular

In the geometry of hyperbolic 3-space, the order-5-3 square honeycomb or 4,5,3 honeycomb a regular space-filling tessellation (or honeycomb). Each infinite cell consists of a pentagonal tiling whose vertices lie on a 2-hypercycle, each of which has a limiting circle on the ideal sphere.

== Geometry ==
The Schläfli symbol of the order-5-3 square honeycomb is {4,5,3}, with three order-4 pentagonal tilings meeting at each edge. The vertex figure of this honeycomb is a dodecahedron, {5,3}.

Poincaré disk model (Vertex centered)	Ideal surface

== Related polytopes and honeycombs ==
It is a part of a series of regular polytopes and honeycombs with {p,5,3} Schläfli symbol, and dodecahedral vertex figures:

=== Order-5-3 pentagonal honeycomb ===
Order-5-3 pentagonal honeycomb
Type	Regular honeycomb
Schläfli symbol	{5,5,3}
Coxeter diagram	
Cells	{5,5}
Faces	{5}
Vertex figure	{5,3}
Dual	{3,5,5}
Coxeter group	[5,5,3]
Properties	Regular

In the geometry of hyperbolic 3-space, the order-5-3 pentagonal honeycomb or 5,5,3 honeycomb a regular space-filling tessellation (or honeycomb). Each infinite cell consists of an order-5 pentagonal tiling whose vertices lie on a 2-hypercycle, each of which has a limiting circle on the ideal sphere.

The Schläfli symbol of the order-5-3 pentagonal honeycomb is {5,5,3}, with three order-5 pentagonal tilings meeting at each edge. The vertex figure of this honeycomb is a dodecahedron, {5,3}.

Poincaré disk model (Vertex centered)	Ideal surface

=== Order-5-3 hexagonal honeycomb ===
Order-5-3 hexagonal honeycomb
Type	Regular honeycomb
Schläfli symbol	{6,5,3}
Coxeter diagram	
Cells	{6,5}
Faces	{6}
Vertex figure	{5,3}
Dual	{3,5,6}
Coxeter group	[6,5,3]
Properties	Regular

In the geometry of hyperbolic 3-space, the order-5-3 hexagonal honeycomb or 6,5,3 honeycomb a regular space-filling tessellation (or honeycomb). Each infinite cell consists of an order-5 hexagonal tiling whose vertices lie on a 2-hypercycle, each of which has a limiting circle on the ideal sphere.

The Schläfli symbol of the order-5-3 hexagonal honeycomb is {6,5,3}, with three order-5 hexagonal tilings meeting at each edge. The vertex figure of this honeycomb is a dodecahedron, {5,3}.

Poincaré disk model (Vertex centered)	Ideal surface

=== Order-5-3 heptagonal honeycomb ===
Order-5-3 heptagonal honeycomb
Type	Regular honeycomb
Schläfli symbol	{7,5,3}
Coxeter diagram	
Cells	{7,5}
Faces	{7}
Vertex figure	{5,3}
Dual	{3,5,7}
Coxeter group	[7,5,3]
Properties	Regular

In the geometry of hyperbolic 3-space, the order-5-3 heptagonal honeycomb or 7,5,3 honeycomb a regular space-filling tessellation (or honeycomb). Each infinite cell consists of an order-5 heptagonal tiling whose vertices lie on a 2-hypercycle, each of which has a limiting circle on the ideal sphere.

The Schläfli symbol of the order-5-3 heptagonal honeycomb is {7,5,3}, with three order-5 heptagonal tilings meeting at each edge. The vertex figure of this honeycomb is a dodecahedron, {5,3}.

Poincaré disk model (Vertex centered)	Ideal surface

=== Order-5-3 octagonal honeycomb ===
Order-5-3 octagonal honeycomb
Type	Regular honeycomb
Schläfli symbol	{8,5,3}
Coxeter diagram	
Cells	{8,5}
Faces	{8}
Vertex figure	{5,3}
Dual	{3,5,8}
Coxeter group	[8,5,3]
Properties	Regular

In the geometry of hyperbolic 3-space, the order-5-3 octagonal honeycomb or 8,5,3 honeycomb a regular space-filling tessellation (or honeycomb). Each infinite cell consists of an order-5 octagonal tiling whose vertices lie on a 2-hypercycle, each of which has a limiting circle on the ideal sphere.

The Schläfli symbol of the order-5-3 octagonal honeycomb is {8,5,3}, with three order-5 octagonal tilings meeting at each edge. The vertex figure of this honeycomb is a dodecahedron, {5,3}.

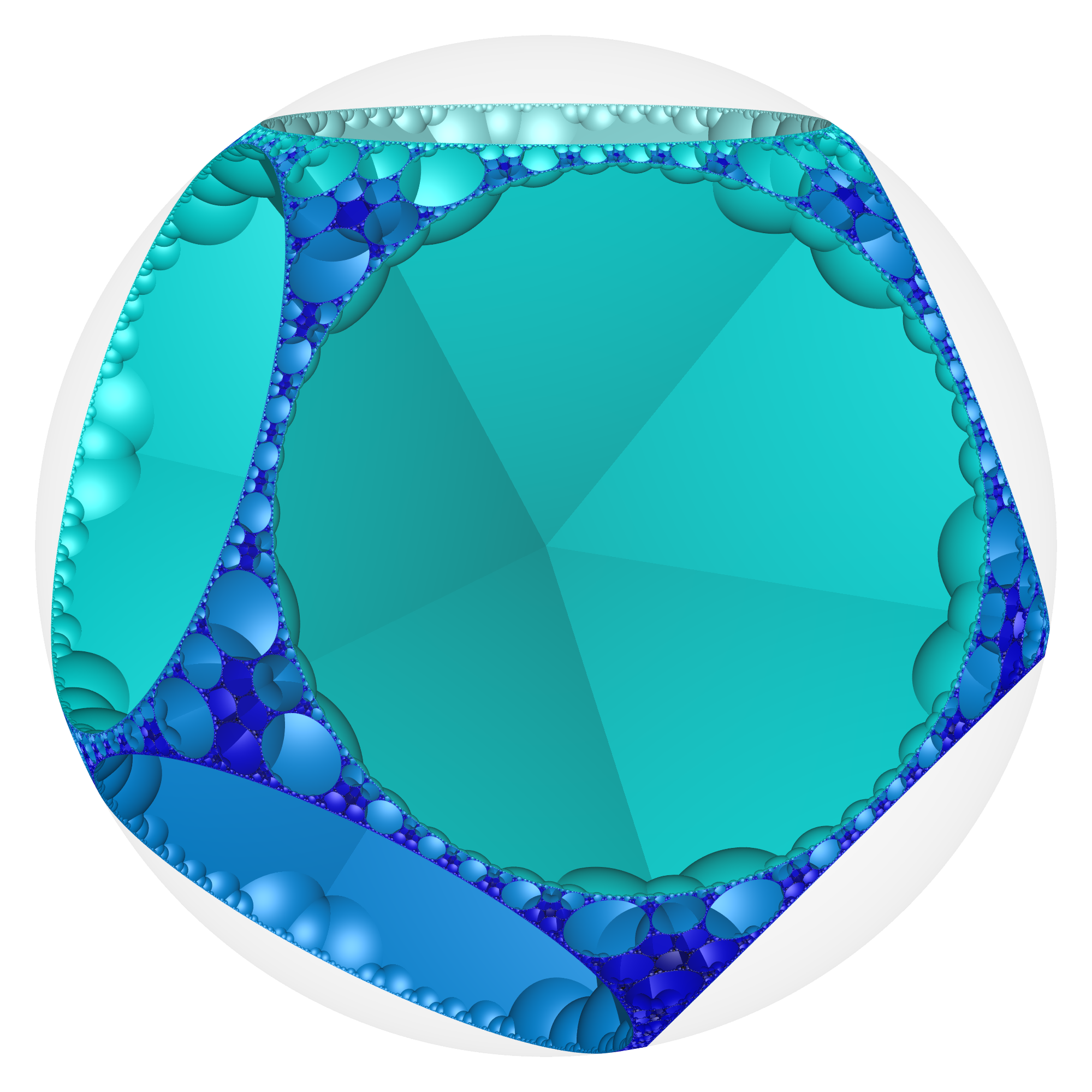
Poincaré disk model
(Vertex centered)

=== Order-5-3 apeirogonal honeycomb ===
Order-5-3 apeirogonal honeycomb
Type	Regular honeycomb
Schläfli symbol	{∞,5,3}
Coxeter diagram	
Cells	{∞,5}
Faces	Apeirogon {∞}
Vertex figure	{5,3}
Dual	{3,5,∞}
Coxeter group	[∞,5,3]
Properties	Regular

In the geometry of hyperbolic 3-space, the order-5-3 apeirogonal honeycomb or ∞,5,3 honeycomb a regular space-filling tessellation (or honeycomb). Each infinite cell consists of an order-5 apeirogonal tiling whose vertices lie on a 2-hypercycle, each of which has a limiting circle on the ideal sphere.

The Schläfli symbol of the apeirogonal tiling honeycomb is {∞,5,3}, with three order-5 apeirogonal tilings meeting at each edge. The vertex figure of this honeycomb is a dodecahedron, {5,3}.

The "ideal surface" projection below is a plane-at-infinity, in the Poincaré half-space model of H3. It shows an Apollonian gasket pattern of circles inside a largest circle.

Poincaré disk model (Vertex centered)	Ideal surface

== See also ==
- Convex uniform honeycombs in hyperbolic space
- List of regular polytopes
