= Dodecahedral-icosahedral honeycomb =

Honeycomb made from unique polyhedrons

Dodecahedral-icosahedral honeycomb
Type	Compact uniform honeycomb
Schläfli symbol	{(3,5,3,5)} or {(5,3,5,3)}
Coxeter diagram	or
Cells	{5,3} {3,5} r{5,3}
Faces	triangle {3} pentagon {5}
Vertex figure	rhombicosidodecahedron
Coxeter group	[(5,3)^{[2]}]
Properties	Vertex-transitive, edge-transitive

In the geometry of hyperbolic 3-space, the dodecahedral-icosahedral honeycomb is a uniform honeycomb, constructed from dodecahedron, icosahedron, and icosidodecahedron cells, in a rhombicosidodecahedron vertex figure.

A geometric honeycomb is a space-filling of polyhedral or higher-dimensional cells, so that there are no gaps. It is an example of the more general mathematical tiling or tessellation in any number of dimensions.

Honeycombs are usually constructed in ordinary Euclidean ("flat") space, like the convex uniform honeycombs. They may also be constructed in non-Euclidean spaces, such as hyperbolic uniform honeycombs. Any finite uniform polytope can be projected to its circumsphere to form a uniform honeycomb in spherical space.

== Images ==
Wide-angle perspective views:

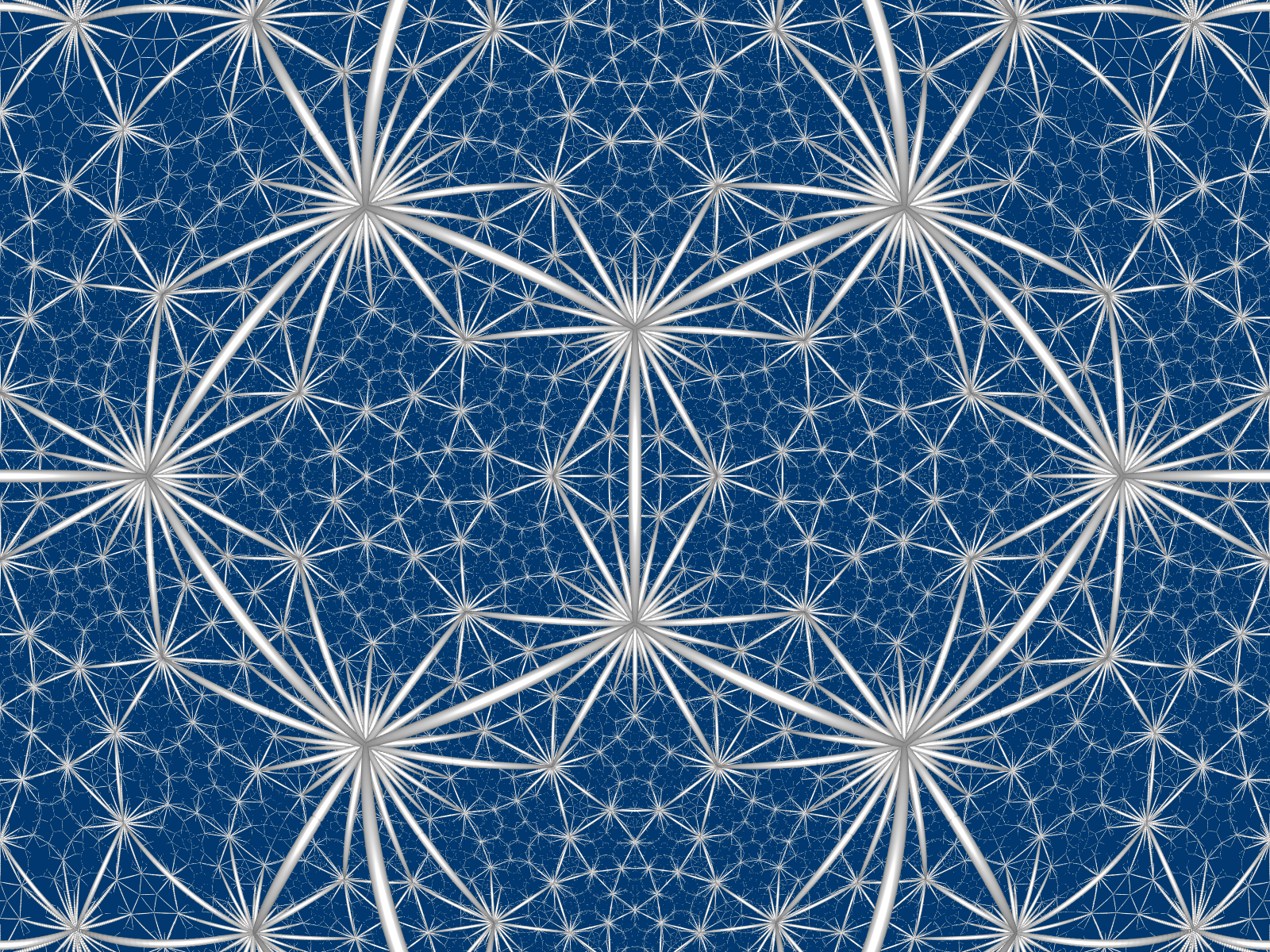
Centered on dodecahedron

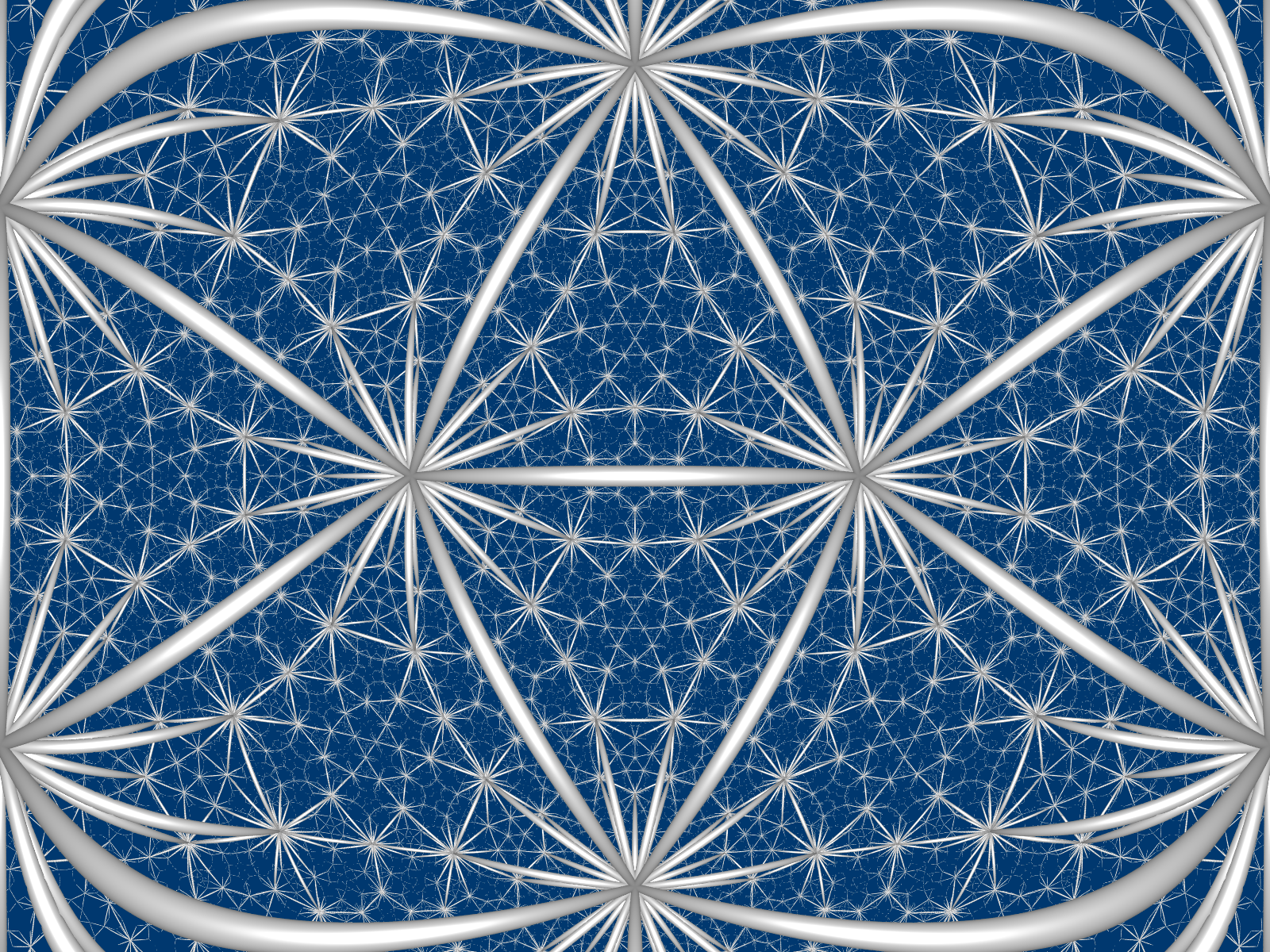
Centered on icosahedron

== Related honeycombs ==
There are 5 related uniform honeycombs generated within the same family, generated with 2 or more rings of the Coxeter group:,,,,.

=== Rectified dodecahedral-icosahedral honeycomb ===
Rectified dodecahedral-icosahedral honeycomb
Type	Compact uniform honeycomb
Schläfli symbol	r{(5,3,5,3)}
Coxeter diagrams	or
Cells	r{5,3} rr{3,5}
Faces	triangle {3} square {4} pentagon {5}
Vertex figure	cuboid
Coxeter group	[[(5,3)^{[2]}]],
Properties	Vertex-transitive, edge-transitive

The rectified dodecahedral-icosahedral honeycomb is a compact uniform honeycomb, constructed from icosidodecahedron and rhombicosidodecahedron cells, in a cuboid vertex figure. It has a Coxeter diagram.

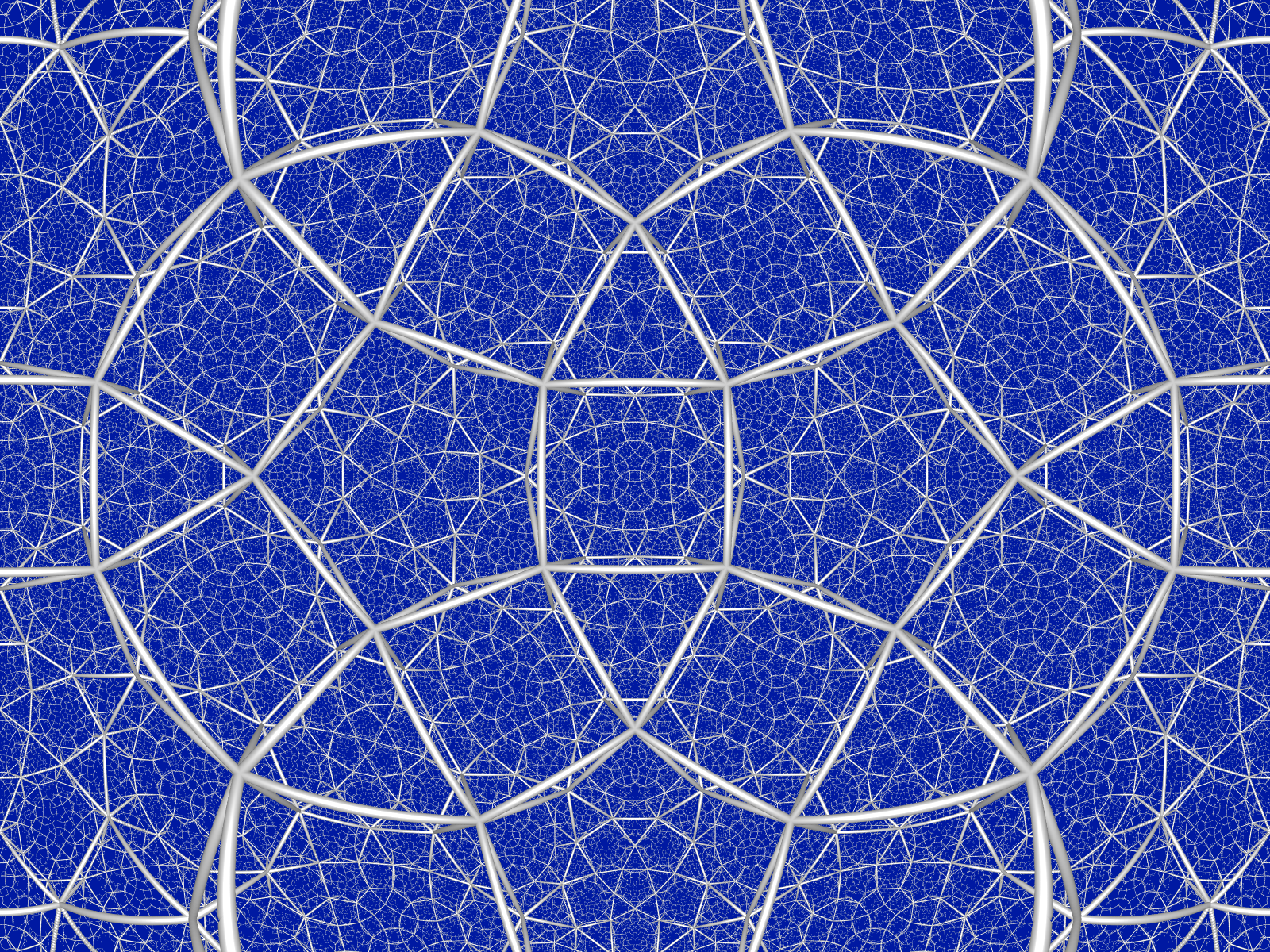

Perspective view from center of rhombicosidodecahedron

=== Cyclotruncated dodecahedral-icosahedral honeycomb ===
Cyclotruncated dodecahedral-icosahedral honeycomb
Type	Compact uniform honeycomb
Schläfli symbol	ct{(5,3,5,3)}
Coxeter diagrams	or
Cells	t{5,3} {3,5}
Faces	triangle {3} decagon {10}
Vertex figure	pentagonal antiprism
Coxeter group	[[(5,3)^{[2]}]],
Properties	Vertex-transitive, edge-transitive

The cyclotruncated dodecahedral-icosahedral honeycomb is a compact uniform honeycomb, constructed from truncated dodecahedron and icosahedron cells, in a pentagonal antiprism vertex figure. It has a Coxeter diagram.

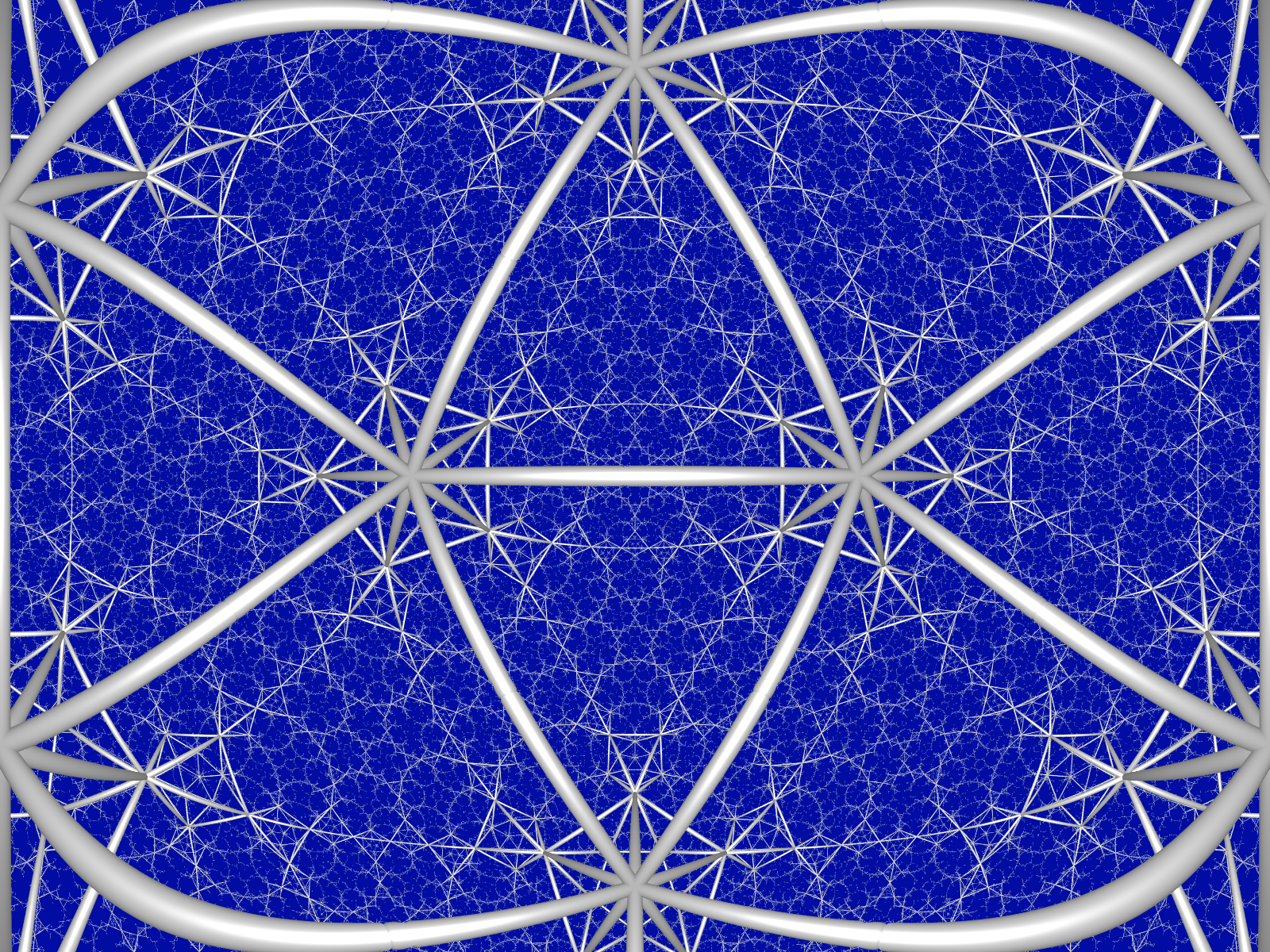

Perspective view from center of icosahedron

=== Cyclotruncated icosahedral-dodecahedral honeycomb ===
Cyclotruncated icosahedral-dodecahedral honeycomb
Type	Compact uniform honeycomb
Schläfli symbol	ct{(3,5,3,5)}
Coxeter diagrams	or
Cells	{5,3} t{3,5}
Faces	pentagon {5} hexagon {6}
Vertex figure	triangular antiprism
Coxeter group	[[(5,3)^{[2]}]],
Properties	Vertex-transitive, edge-transitive

The cyclotruncated icosahedral-dodecahedral honeycomb is a compact uniform honeycomb, constructed from dodecahedron and truncated icosahedron cells, in a triangular antiprism vertex figure. It has a Coxeter diagram.

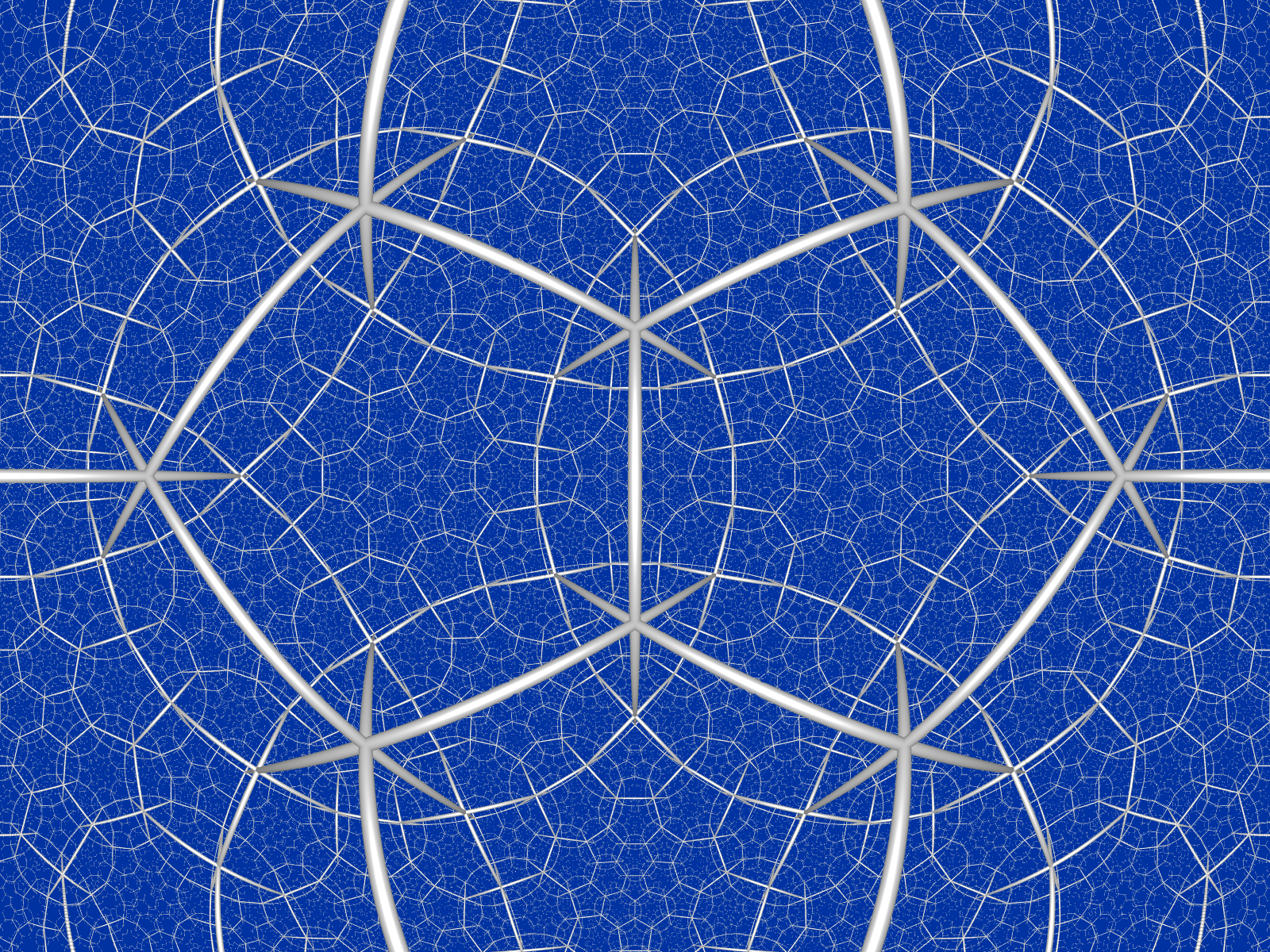

Perspective view from center of dodecahedron

It can be seen as somewhat analogous to the pentahexagonal tiling, which has pentagonal and hexagonal faces:

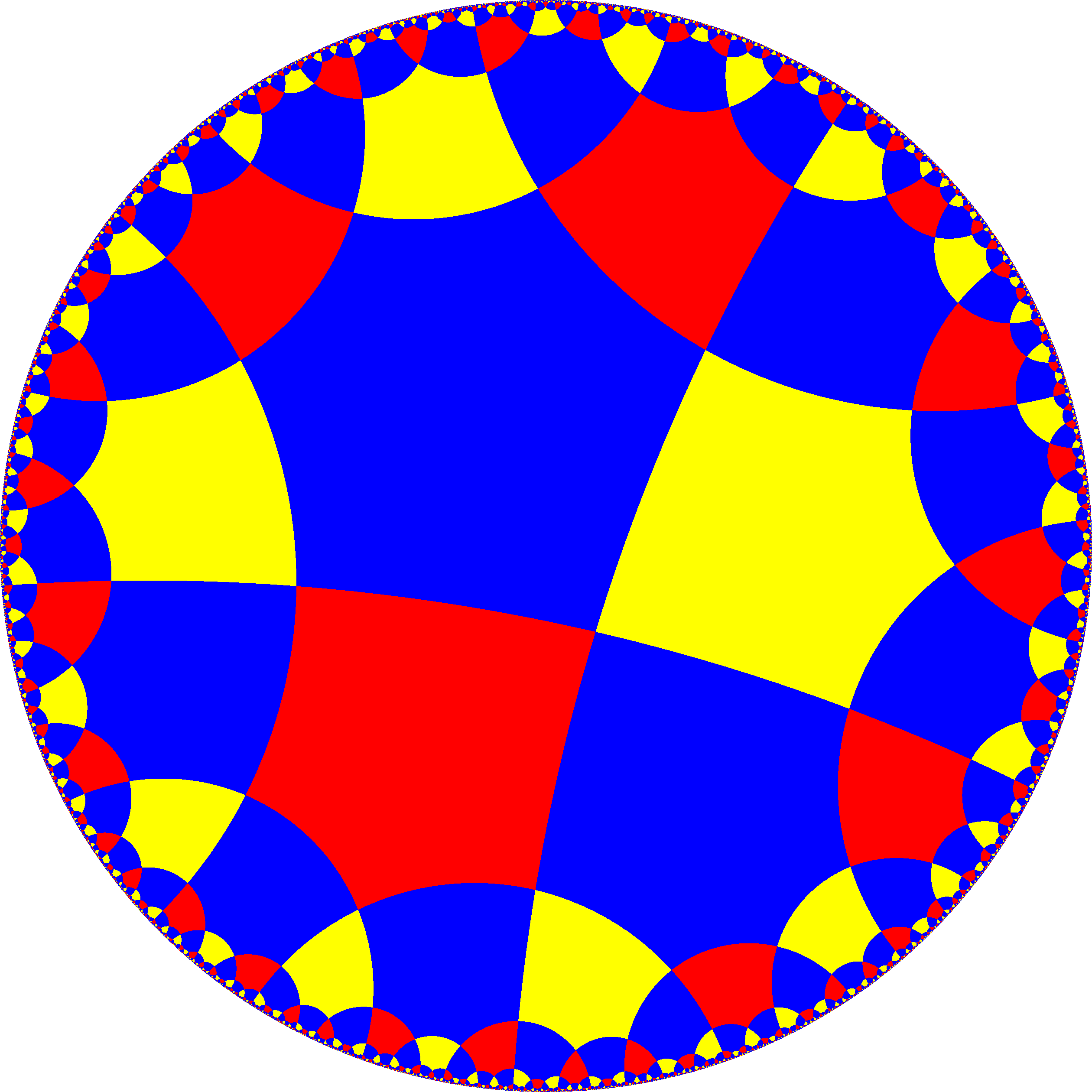

=== Truncated dodecahedral-icosahedral honeycomb ===
Truncated dodecahedral-icosahedral honeycomb
Type	Compact uniform honeycomb
Schläfli symbol	t{(5,3,5,3)}
Coxeter diagrams	or or or
Cells	t{3,5} t{5,3} rr{3,5} tr{5,3}
Faces	triangle {3} square {4} pentagon {5} hexagon {6} decagon {10}
Vertex figure	trapezoidal pyramid
Coxeter group	[(5,3)^{[2]}]
Properties	Vertex-transitive

The truncated dodecahedral-icosahedral honeycomb is a compact uniform honeycomb, constructed from truncated icosahedron, truncated dodecahedron, rhombicosidodecahedron, and truncated icosidodecahedron cells, in a trapezoidal pyramid vertex figure. It has a Coxeter diagram.

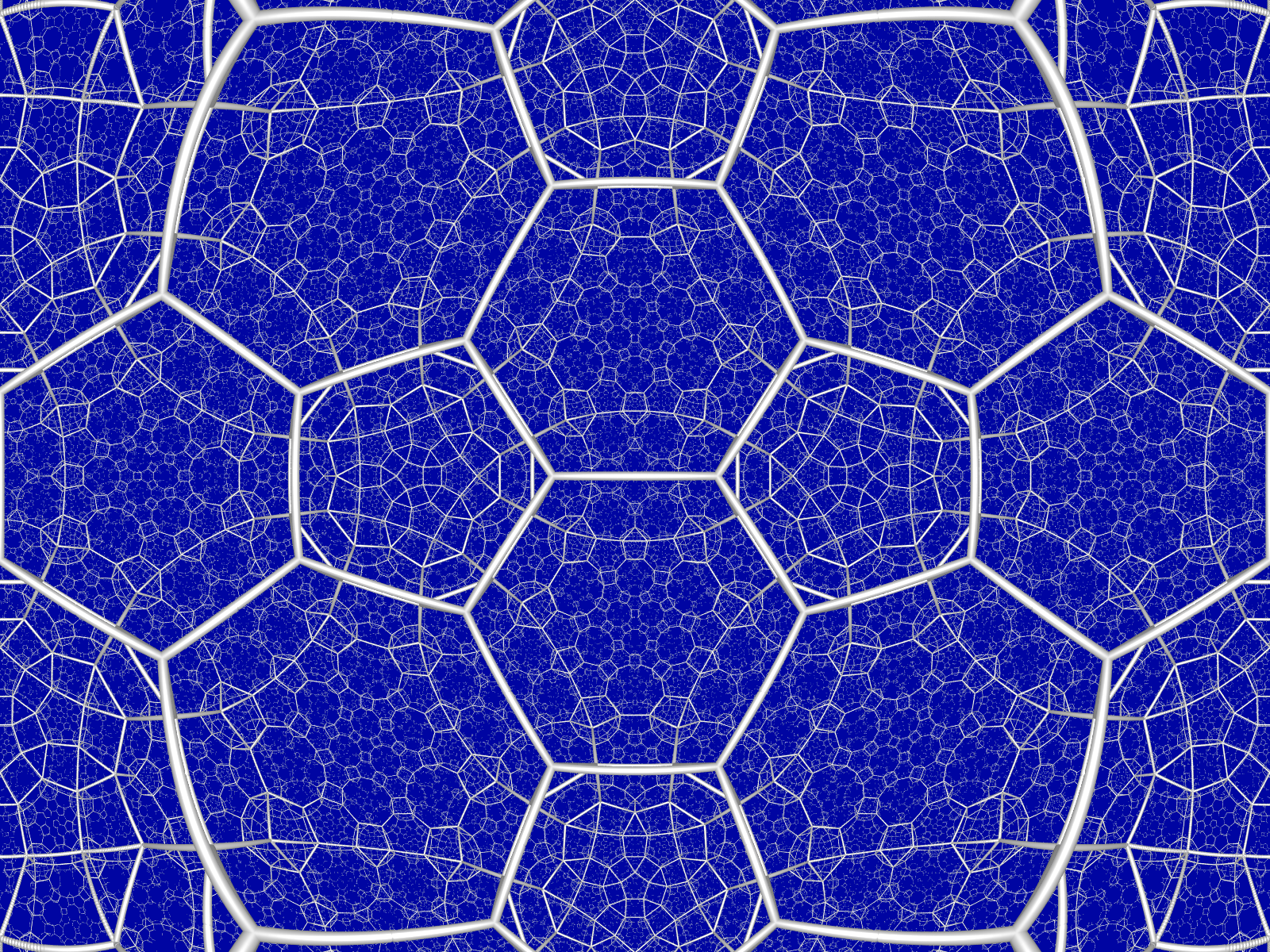

Perspective view from center of truncated icosahedron

=== Omnitruncated dodecahedral-icosahedral honeycomb ===
Omnitruncated dodecahedral-icosahedral honeycomb
Type	Compact uniform honeycomb
Schläfli symbol	tr{(5,3,5,3)}
Coxeter diagrams	
Cells	tr{3,5}
Faces	square {4} hexagon {6} decagon {10}
Vertex figure	Rhombic disphenoid
Coxeter group	[(2,2)^{+}[(5,3)^{[2]}]],
Properties	Vertex-transitive, edge-transitive, cell-transitive

The omnitruncated dodecahedral-icosahedral honeycomb is a compact uniform honeycomb, constructed from truncated icosidodecahedron cells, in a rhombic disphenoid vertex figure. It has a Coxeter diagram.

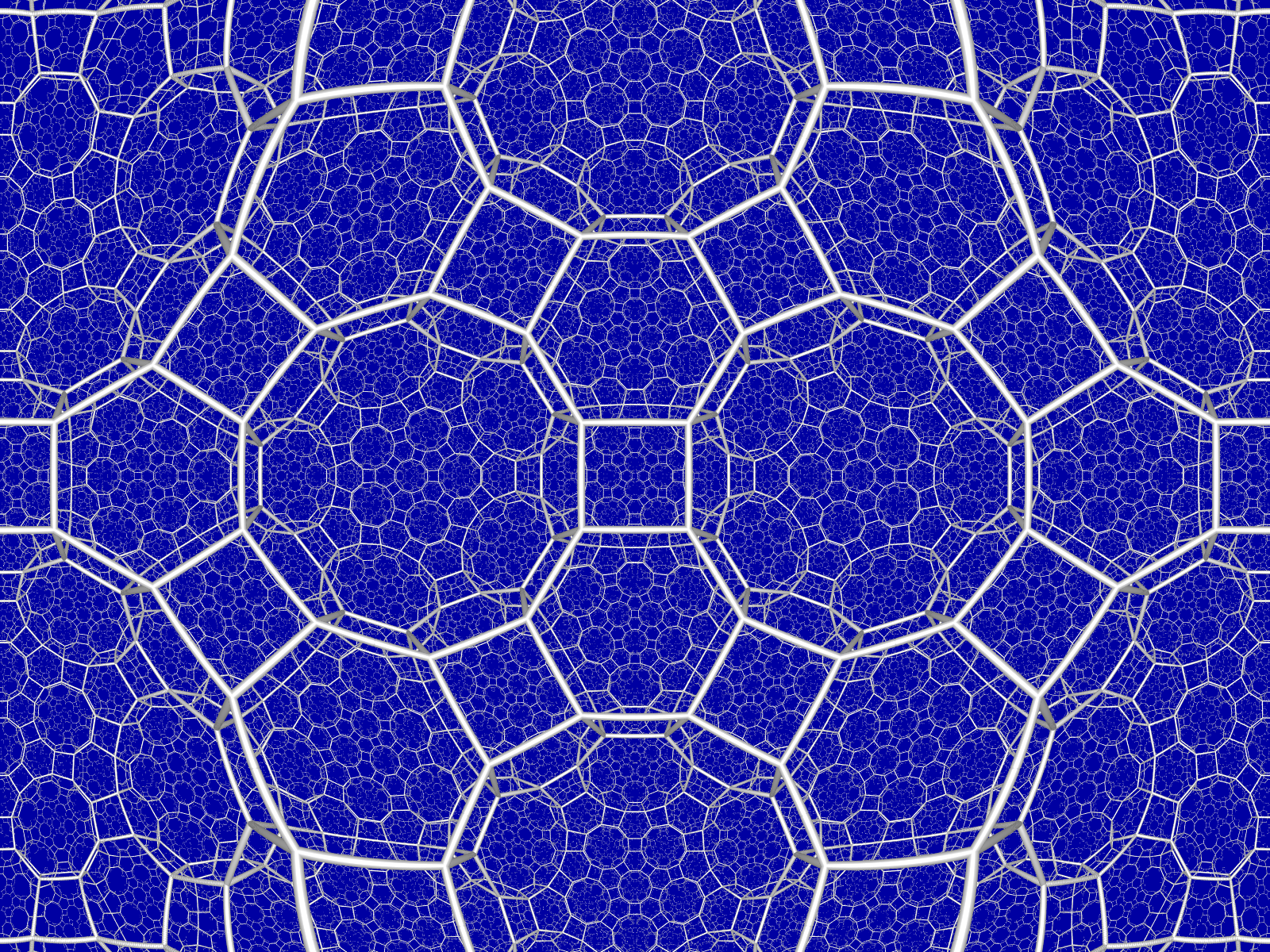

Perspective view from center of truncated icosidodecahedron

== See also ==
- Convex uniform honeycombs in hyperbolic space
- List of regular polytopes
