= Order-4 icosahedral honeycomb =

Order-4 icosahedral honeycomb
Type	Regular honeycomb
Schläfli symbols	{3,5,4}
Coxeter diagrams	
Cells	{3,5}
Faces	{3}
Edge figure	{4}
Vertex figure	{5,4}
Dual	{4,5,3}
Coxeter group	[3,5,4]
Properties	Regular

In the geometry of hyperbolic 3-space, the order-4 icosahedral honeycomb is a regular space-filling tessellation (or honeycomb) with Schläfli symbol {3,5,4}.

== Geometry ==
It has four icosahedra {3,5} around each edge. All vertices are ultra-ideal (existing beyond the ideal boundary) with infinitely many icosahedra existing around each vertex in an order-4 pentagonal tiling vertex arrangement.

Poincaré disk model (Cell centered)	Ideal surface

It has a second construction as a uniform honeycomb, Schläfli symbol {3,5^{1,1}}, Coxeter diagram,, with alternating types or colors of icosahedral cells. In Coxeter notation the half symmetry is [3,5,4,1^{+}] = [3,5^{1,1}].

== Related polytopes and honeycombs ==
It a part of a sequence of regular polychora and honeycombs with icosahedral cells: {3,5,p}

{3,5,p} polytopes
Space	H^{3}						
Form	Compact	Noncompact					
Name	{3,5,3}	{3,5,4}	{3,5,5}	{3,5,6}	{3,5,7}	{3,5,8}	... {3,5,∞}
Image							
Vertex figure	{5,3}	{5,4}	{5,5}	{5,6}	{5,7}	{5,8}	{5,∞}

=== Order-5 icosahedral honeycomb ===
Order-5 icosahedral honeycomb
Type	Regular honeycomb
Schläfli symbols	{3,5,5}
Coxeter diagrams	
Cells	{3,5}
Faces	{3}
Edge figure	{5}
Vertex figure	{5,5}
Dual	{5,5,3}
Coxeter group	[3,5,5]
Properties	Regular

In the geometry of hyperbolic 3-space, the order-5 icosahedral honeycomb is a regular space-filling tessellation (or honeycomb) with Schläfli symbol {3,5,5}. It has five icosahedra, {3,5}, around each edge. All vertices are ultra-ideal (existing beyond the ideal boundary) with infinitely many icosahedra existing around each vertex in an order-5 pentagonal tiling vertex arrangement.

Poincaré disk model (Cell centered)	Ideal surface

=== Order-6 icosahedral honeycomb ===
Order-6 icosahedral honeycomb
Type	Regular honeycomb
Schläfli symbols	{3,5,6} {3,(5,∞,5)}
Coxeter diagrams	=
Cells	{3,5}
Faces	{3}
Edge figure	{6}
Vertex figure	{5,6}
Dual	{6,5,3}
Coxeter group	[3,5,6]
Properties	Regular

In the geometry of hyperbolic 3-space, the order-6 icosahedral honeycomb is a regular space-filling tessellation (or honeycomb) with Schläfli symbol {3,5,6}. It has six icosahedra, {3,5}, around each edge. All vertices are ultra-ideal (existing beyond the ideal boundary) with infinitely many icosahedra existing around each vertex in an order-6 pentagonal tiling vertex arrangement.

Poincaré disk model (Cell centered)	Ideal surface

=== Order-7 icosahedral honeycomb ===
Order-7 icosahedral honeycomb
Type	Regular honeycomb
Schläfli symbols	{3,5,7}
Coxeter diagrams	
Cells	{3,5}
Faces	{3}
Edge figure	{7}
Vertex figure	{5,7}
Dual	{7,5,3}
Coxeter group	[3,5,7]
Properties	Regular

In the geometry of hyperbolic 3-space, the order-7 icosahedral honeycomb is a regular space-filling tessellation (or honeycomb) with Schläfli symbol {3,5,7}. It has seven icosahedra, {3,5}, around each edge. All vertices are ultra-ideal (existing beyond the ideal boundary) with infinitely many icosahedra existing around each vertex in an order-7 pentagonal tiling vertex arrangement.

Poincaré disk model (Cell centered)	Ideal surface

=== Order-8 icosahedral honeycomb ===
Order-8 icosahedral honeycomb
Type	Regular honeycomb
Schläfli symbols	{3,5,8}
Coxeter diagrams	
Cells	{3,5}
Faces	{3}
Edge figure	{8}
Vertex figure	{5,8}
Dual	{8,5,3}
Coxeter group	[3,5,8]
Properties	Regular

In the geometry of hyperbolic 3-space, the order-8 icosahedral honeycomb is a regular space-filling tessellation (or honeycomb) with Schläfli symbol {3,5,8}. It has eight icosahedra, {3,5}, around each edge. All vertices are ultra-ideal (existing beyond the ideal boundary) with infinitely many icosahedra existing around each vertex in an order-8 pentagonal tiling vertex arrangement.

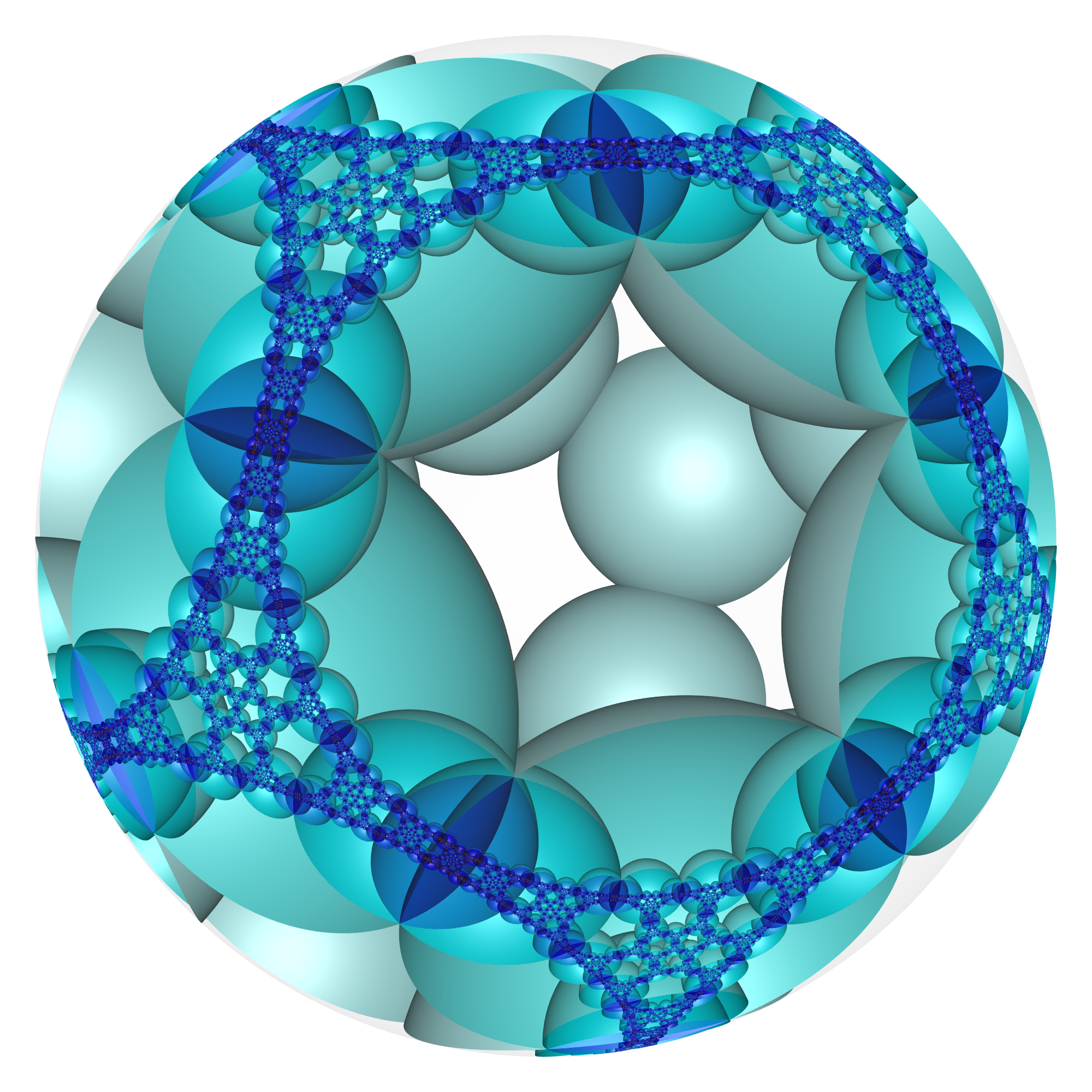
Poincaré disk model
(Cell centered)

=== Infinite-order icosahedral honeycomb ===
Infinite-order icosahedral honeycomb
Type	Regular honeycomb
Schläfli symbols	{3,5,∞} {3,(5,∞,5)}
Coxeter diagrams	=
Cells	{3,5}
Faces	{3}
Edge figure	{∞}
Vertex figure	{5,∞} {(5,∞,5)}
Dual	{∞,5,3}
Coxeter group	[∞,5,3] [3,((5,∞,5))]
Properties	Regular

In the geometry of hyperbolic 3-space, the infinite-order icosahedral honeycomb is a regular space-filling tessellation (or honeycomb) with Schläfli symbol {3,5,∞}. It has infinitely many icosahedra, {3,5}, around each edge. All vertices are ultra-ideal (existing beyond the ideal boundary) with infinitely many icosahedra existing around each vertex in an infinite-order triangular tiling vertex arrangement.

Poincaré disk model (Cell centered)	Ideal surface

It has a second construction as a uniform honeycomb, Schläfli symbol {3,(5,∞,5)}, Coxeter diagram, =, with alternating types or colors of icosahedral cells. In Coxeter notation the half symmetry is [3,5,∞,1^{+}] = [3,((5,∞,5))].

== See also ==
- Convex uniform honeycombs in hyperbolic space
- List of regular polytopes
