= Cubic-octahedral honeycomb =

Cube-octahedron honeycomb
Type	Compact uniform honeycomb
Schläfli symbol	{(3,4,3,4)} or {(4,3,4,3)}
Coxeter diagrams	↔ ↔
Cells	{4,3} {3,4} r{4,3}
Faces	triangle {3} square {4}
Vertex figure	rhombicuboctahedron
Coxeter group	[(4,3)^{[2]}]
Properties	Vertex-transitive, edge-transitive

In the geometry of hyperbolic 3-space, the cubic-octahedral honeycomb is a compact uniform honeycomb, constructed from cube, octahedron, and cuboctahedron cells, in a rhombicuboctahedron vertex figure. It has a single-ring Coxeter diagram,, and is named by its two regular cells.

A geometric honeycomb is a space-filling of polyhedral or higher-dimensional cells, so that there are no gaps. It is an example of the more general mathematical tiling or tessellation in any number of dimensions.

Honeycombs are usually constructed in ordinary Euclidean ("flat") space, like the convex uniform honeycombs. They may also be constructed in non-Euclidean spaces, such as hyperbolic uniform honeycombs. Any finite uniform polytope can be projected to its circumsphere to form a uniform honeycomb in spherical space.

== Images ==
Wide-angle perspective views:

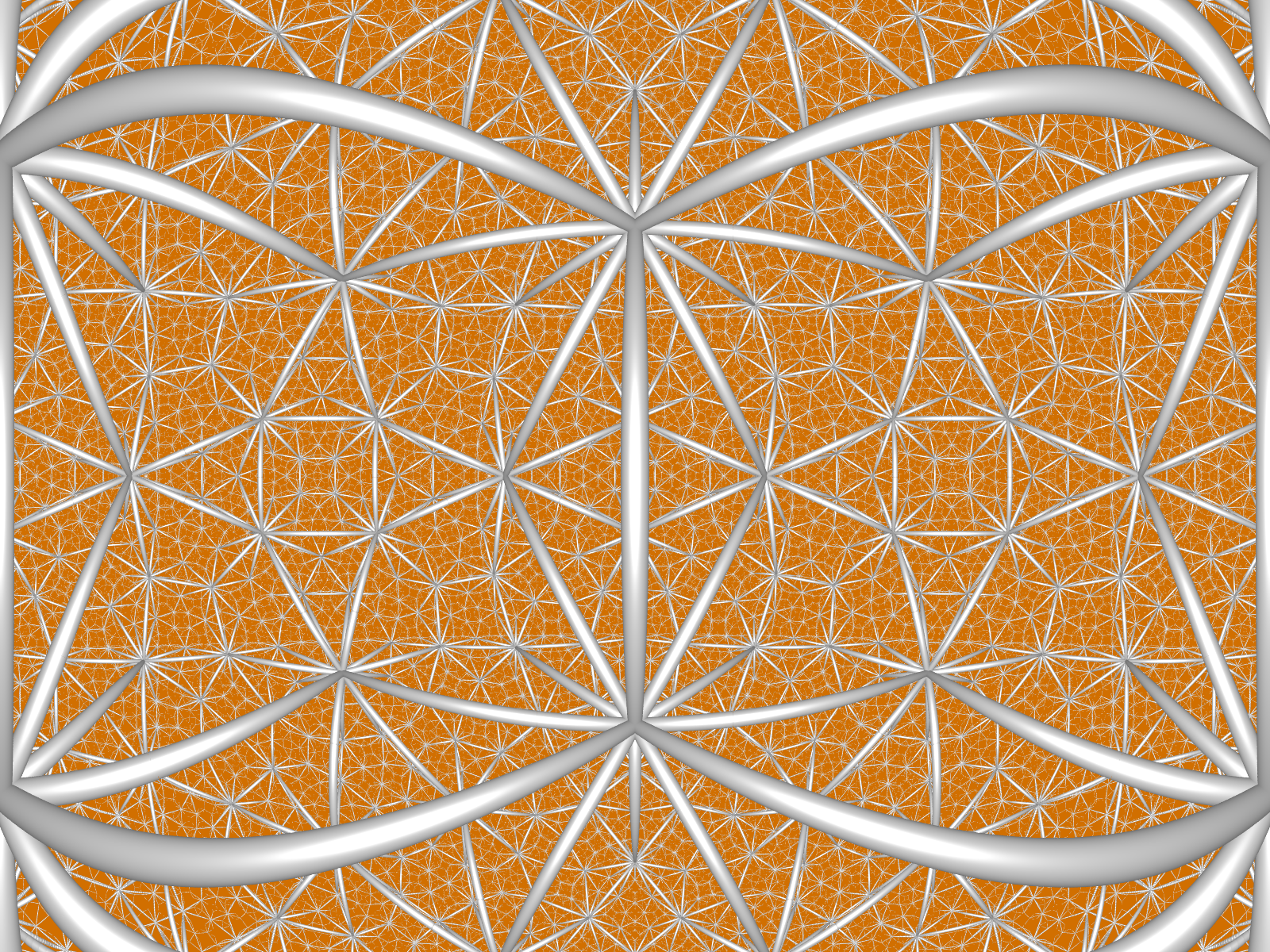
Centered on cube

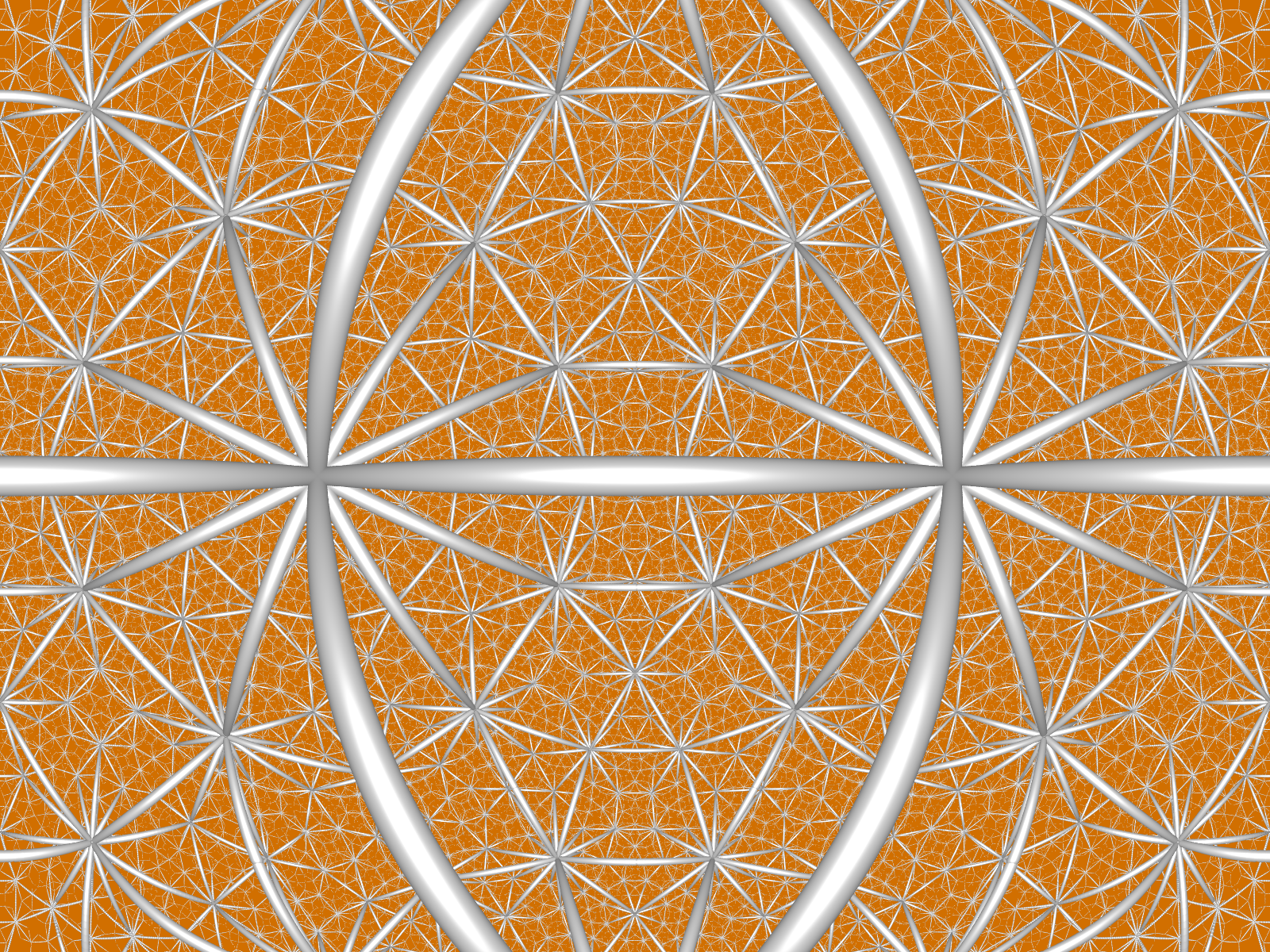
Centered on octahedron

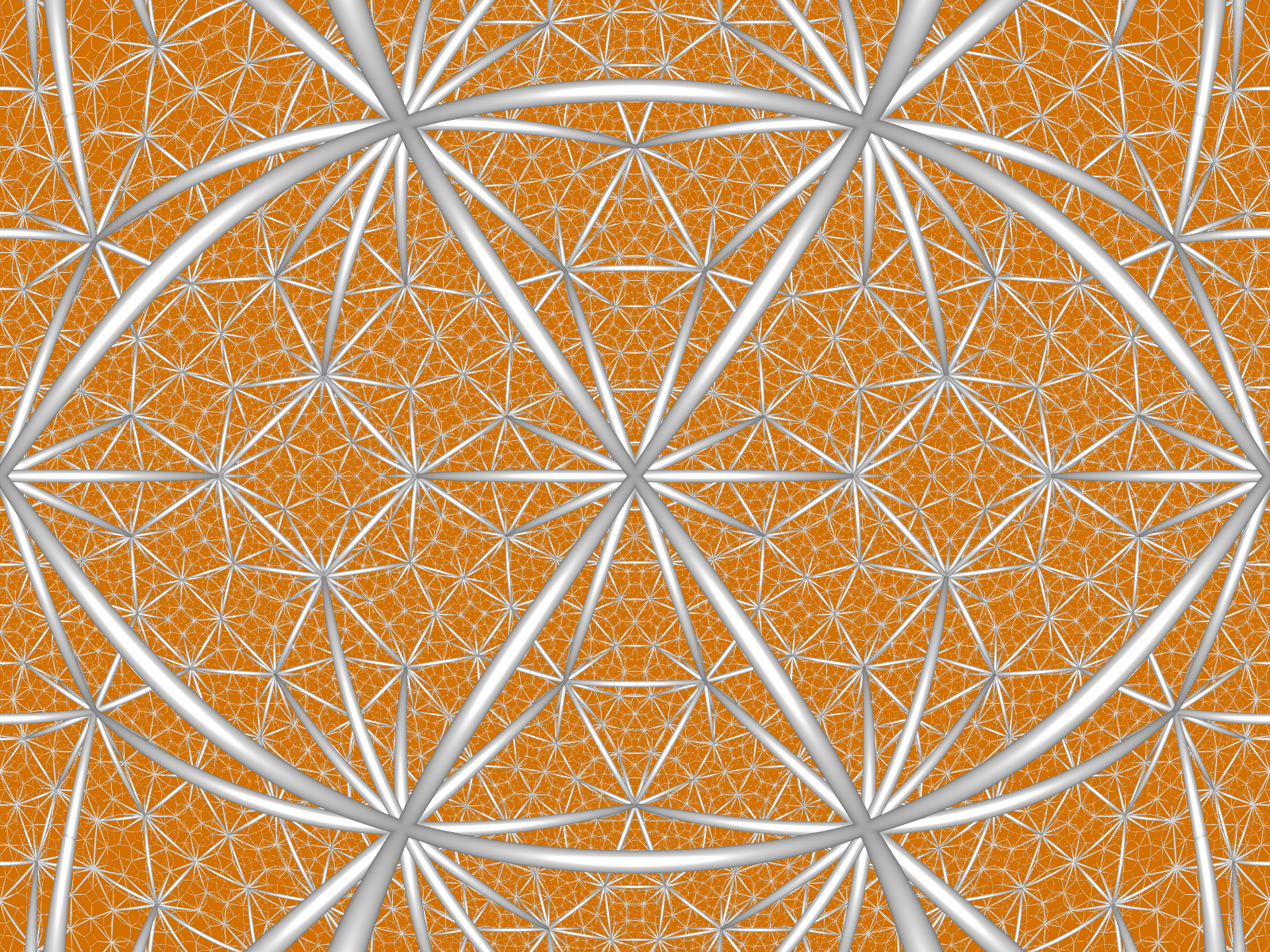
Centered on cuboctahedron

It contains a subgroup H2 tiling, the alternated order-4 hexagonal tiling,, with vertex figure (3.4)^{4}.

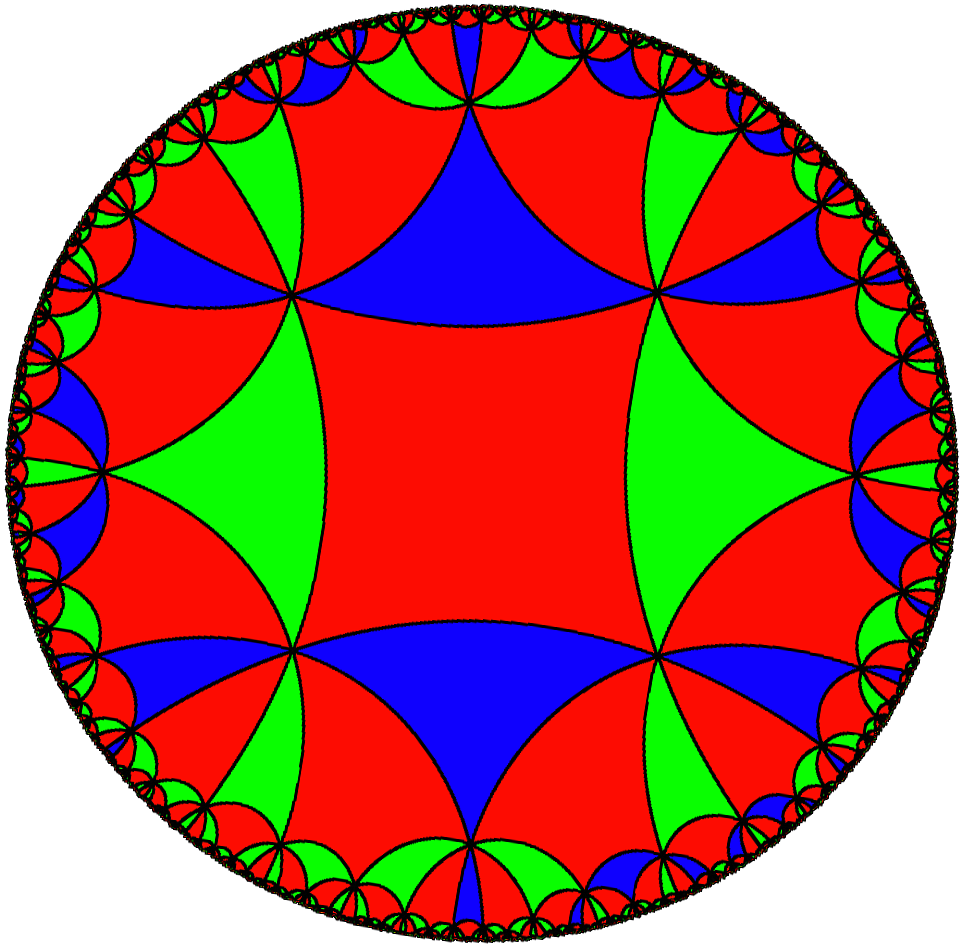

== Symmetry ==
A lower symmetry form, index 6, of this honeycomb can be constructed with [(4,3,4,3^{*})] symmetry, represented by a trigonal trapezohedron fundamental domain, and Coxeter diagram. This lower symmetry can be extended by restoring one mirror as.

Cells
↔ =	↔ =	↔ =

== Related honeycombs ==
There are 5 related uniform honeycombs generated within the same family, generated with 2 or more rings of the Coxeter group:,,,,.

=== Rectified cubic-octahedral honeycomb ===
Rectified cubic-octahedral honeycomb
Type	Compact uniform honeycomb
Schläfli symbol	r{(4,3,4,3)}
Coxeter diagrams	
Cells	r{4,3} rr{3,4}
Faces	triangle {3} square {4}
Vertex figure	cuboid
Coxeter group	[[(4,3)^{[2]}]],
Properties	Vertex-transitive, edge-transitive

The rectified cubic-octahedral honeycomb is a compact uniform honeycomb, constructed from cuboctahedron and rhombicuboctahedron cells, in a cuboid vertex figure. It has a Coxeter diagram.

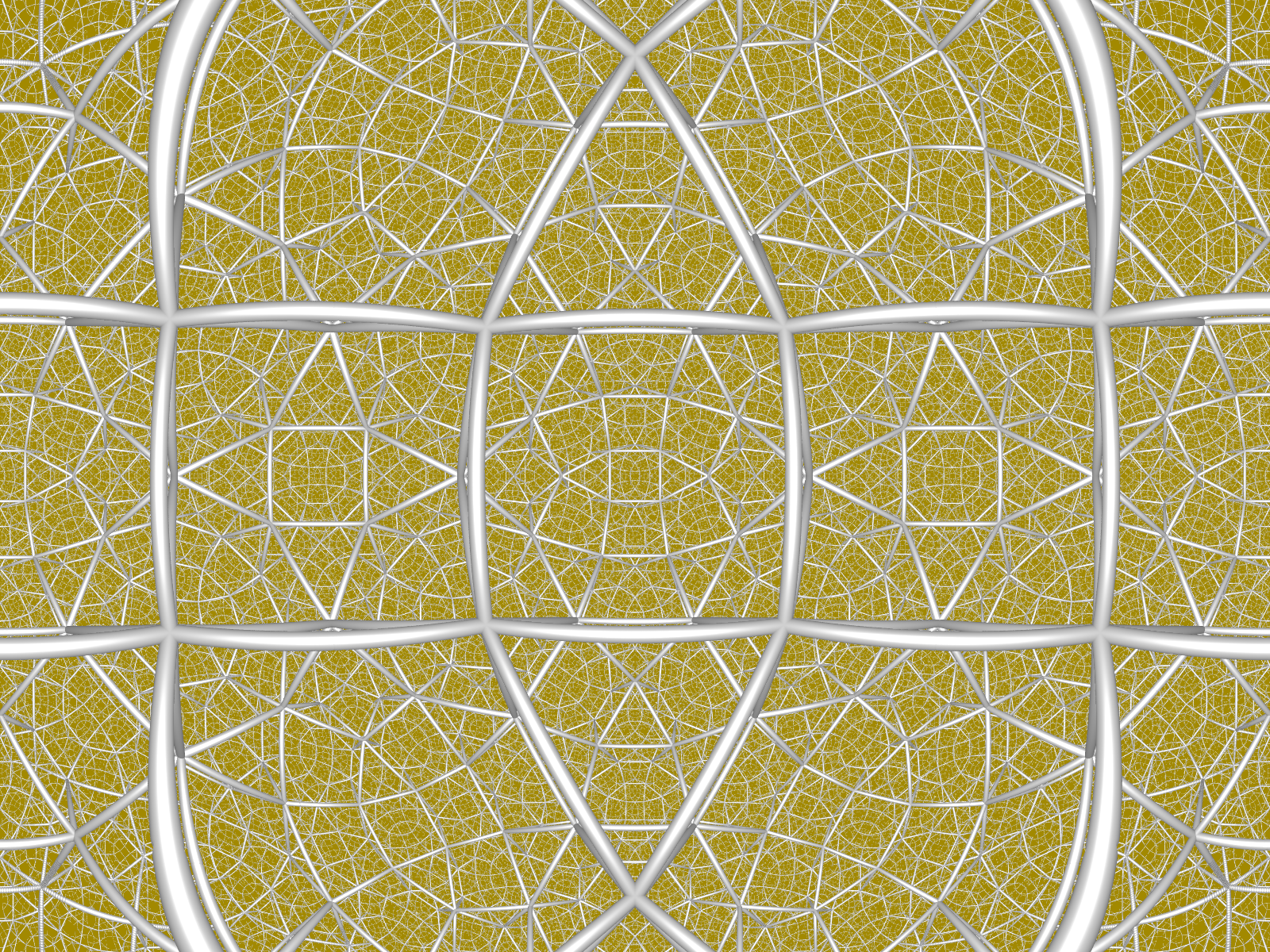

Perspective view from center of rhombicuboctahedron

=== Cyclotruncated cubic-octahedral honeycomb ===
Cyclotruncated cubic-octahedral honeycomb
Type	Compact uniform honeycomb
Schläfli symbol	ct{(4,3,4,3)}
Coxeter diagrams	
Cells	t{4,3} {3,4}
Faces	triangle {3} octagon {8}
Vertex figure	square antiprism
Coxeter group	[[(4,3)^{[2]}]],
Properties	Vertex-transitive, edge-transitive

The cyclotruncated cubic-octahedral honeycomb is a compact uniform honeycomb, constructed from truncated cube and octahedron cells, in a square antiprism vertex figure. It has a Coxeter diagram.

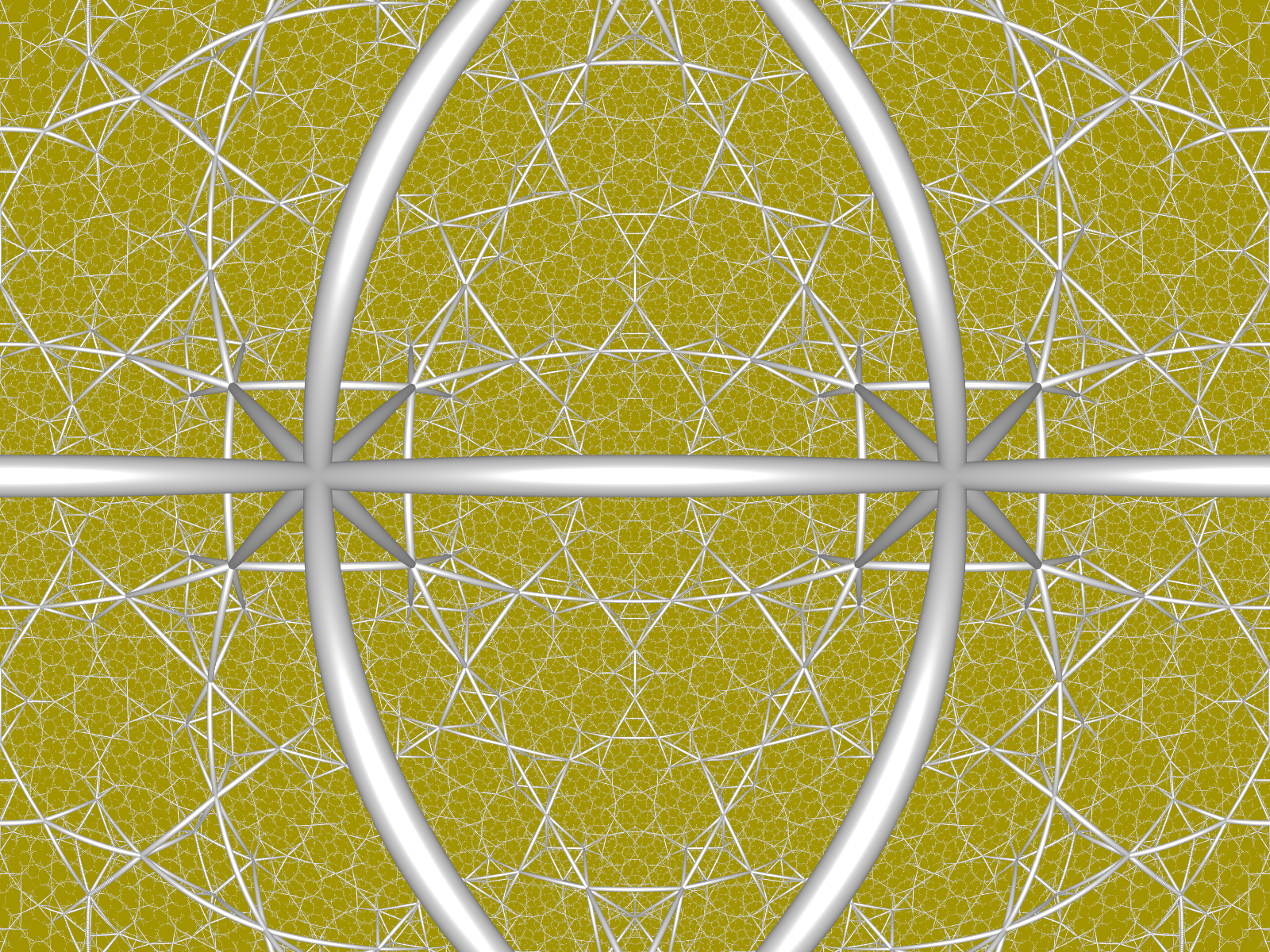

Perspective view from center of octahedron

It can be seen as somewhat analogous to the trioctagonal tiling, which has truncated square and triangle facets:

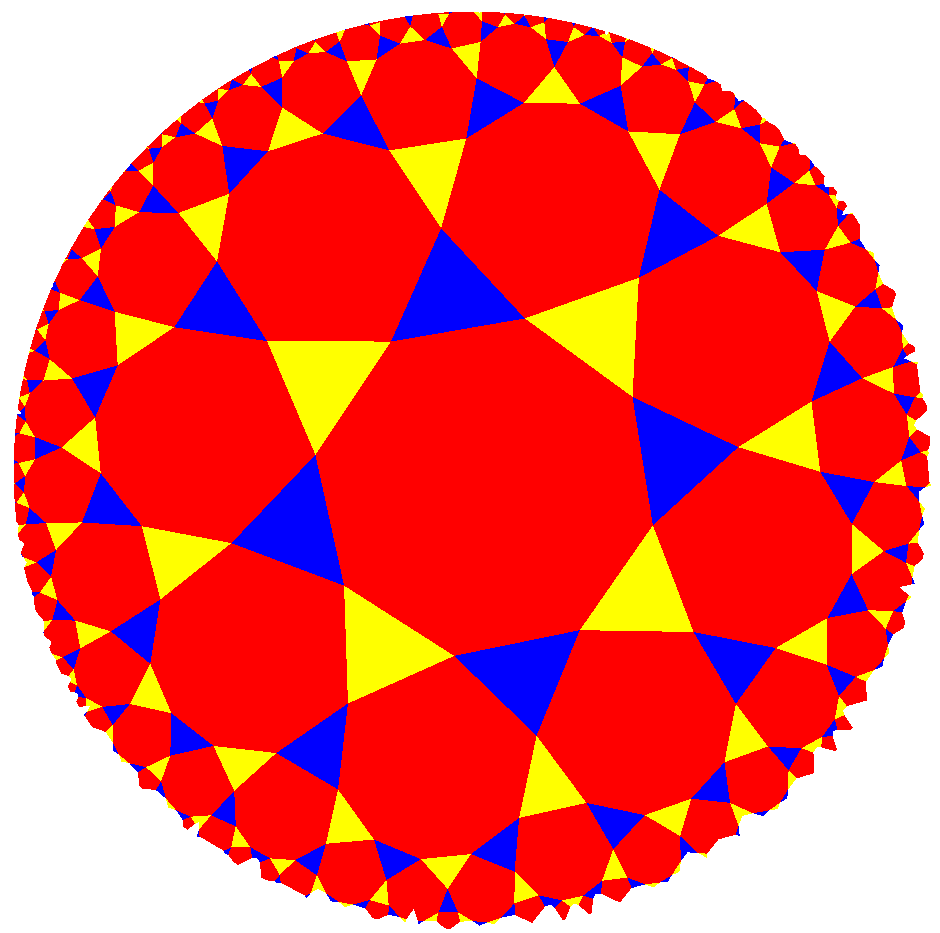

=== Cyclotruncated octahedral-cubic honeycomb ===
Cyclotruncated octahedral-cubic honeycomb
Type	Compact uniform honeycomb
Schläfli symbol	ct{(3,4,3,4)}
Coxeter diagrams	↔ ↔
Cells	{4,3} t{3,4}
Faces	square {4} hexagon {6}
Vertex figure	triangular antiprism
Coxeter group	[[(4,3)^{[2]}]],
Properties	Vertex-transitive, edge-transitive

The cyclotruncated octahedral-cubic honeycomb is a compact uniform honeycomb, constructed from cube and truncated octahedron cells, in a triangular antiprism vertex figure. It has a Coxeter diagram.

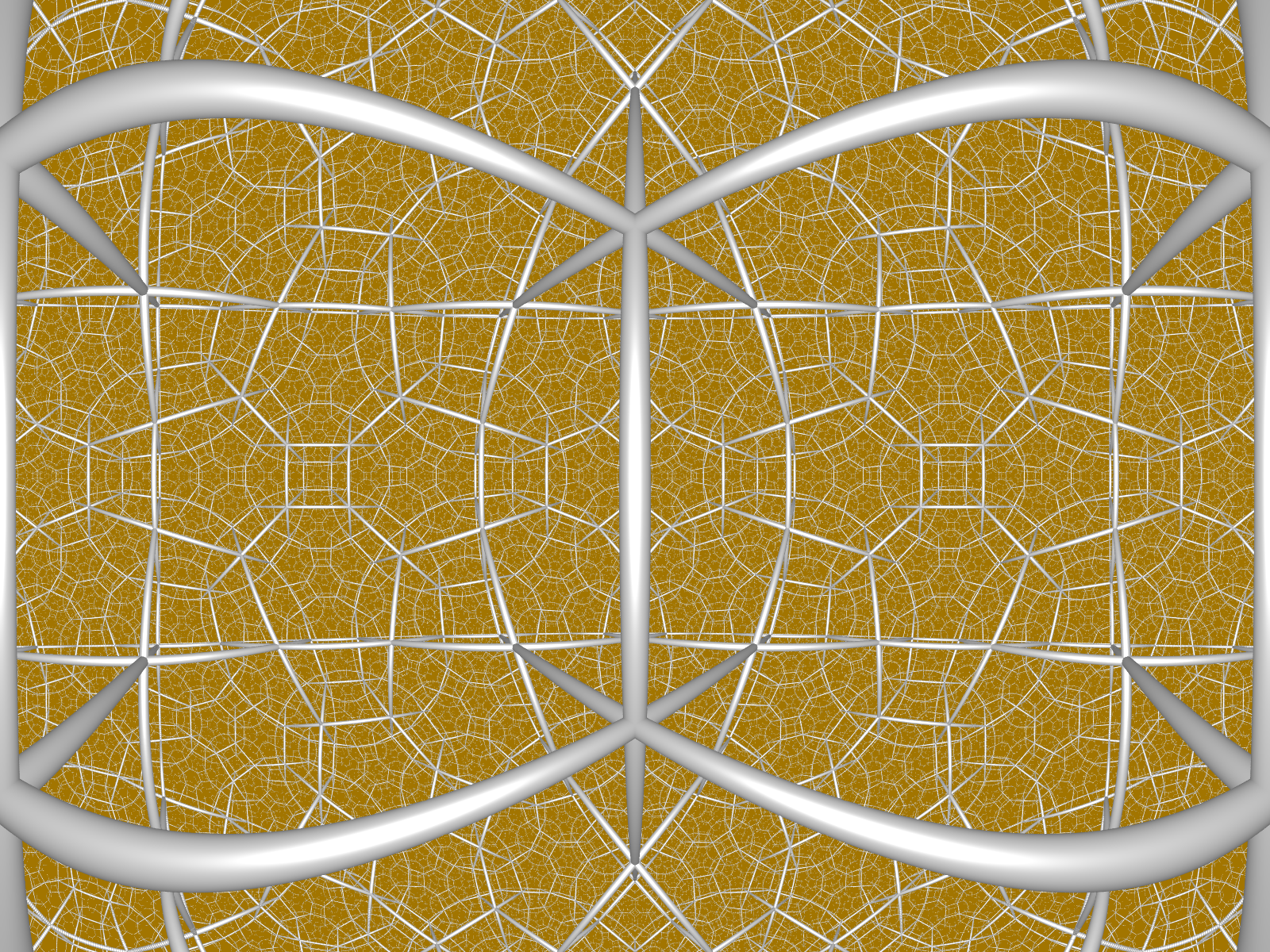

Perspective view from center of cube

It contains an H2 subgroup tetrahexagonal tiling alternating square and hexagonal faces, with Coxeter diagram or half symmetry:

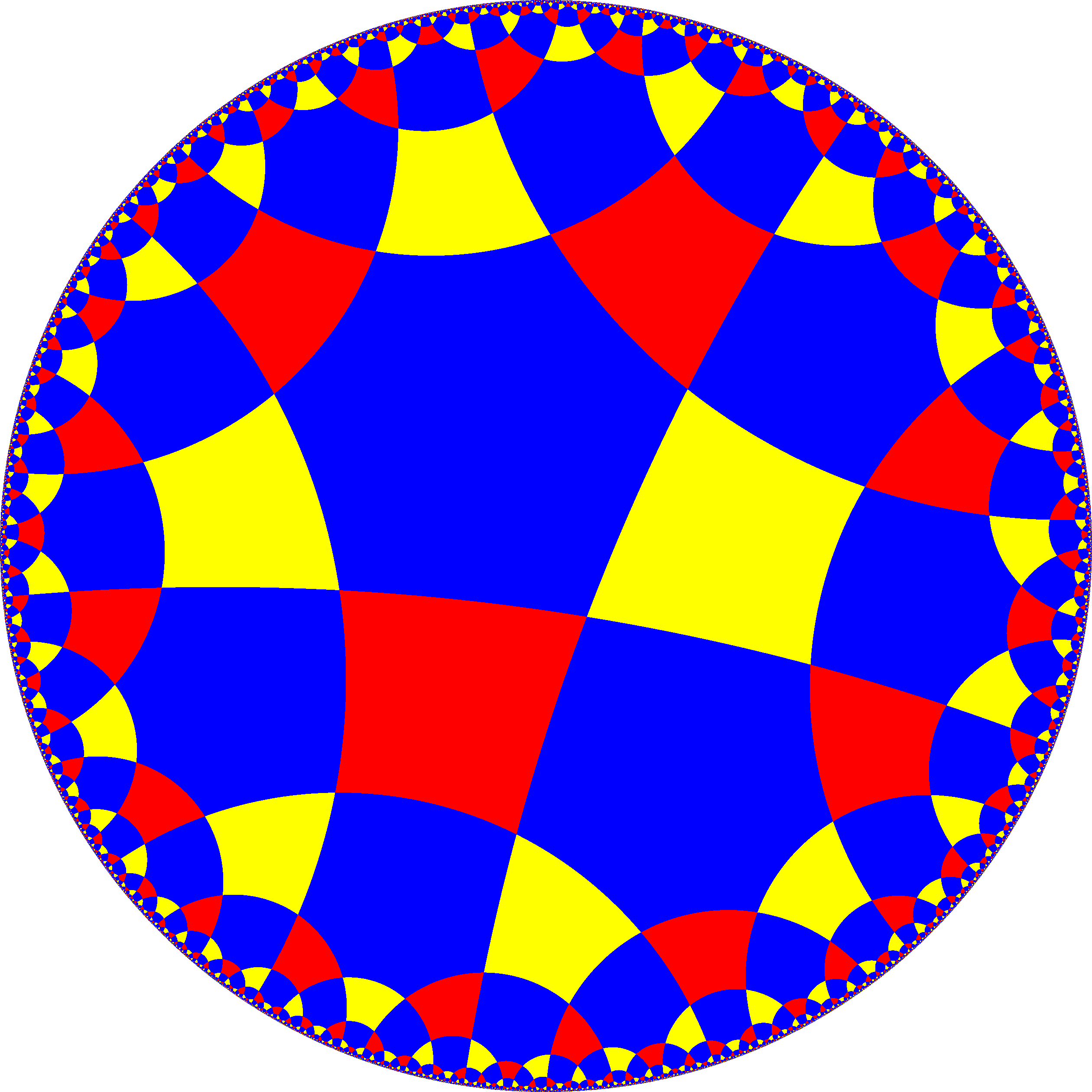
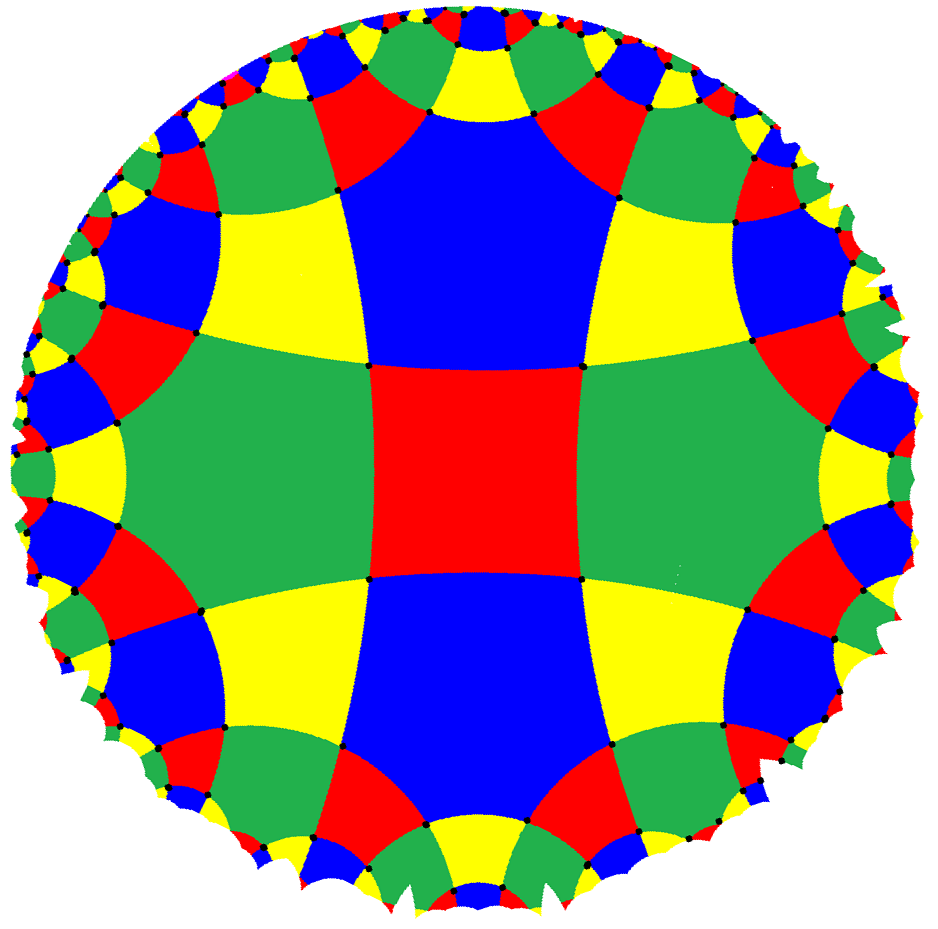

==== Symmetry ====
Fundamental domains
Trigonal trapezohedron ↔	Half domain ↔	H^{2} subgroup, rhombic *3232 ↔

A radial subgroup symmetry, index 6, of this honeycomb can be constructed with [(4,3,4,3^{*})],, represented by a trigonal trapezohedron fundamental domain, and Coxeter diagram. This lower symmetry can be extended by restoring one mirror as.

Cells
↔ =	↔ =

=== Truncated cubic-octahedral honeycomb ===
Truncated cubic-octahedral honeycomb
Type	Compact uniform honeycomb
Schläfli symbol	t{(4,3,4,3)}
Coxeter diagrams	
Cells	t{3,4} t{4,3} rr{3,4} tr{4,3}
Faces	triangle {3} square {4} hexagon {6} octagon {8}
Vertex figure	rectangular pyramid
Coxeter group	[(4,3)^{[2]}]
Properties	Vertex-transitive

The truncated cubic-octahedral honeycomb is a compact uniform honeycomb, constructed from truncated octahedron, truncated cube, rhombicuboctahedron, and truncated cuboctahedron cells, in a rectangular pyramid vertex figure. It has a Coxeter diagram.

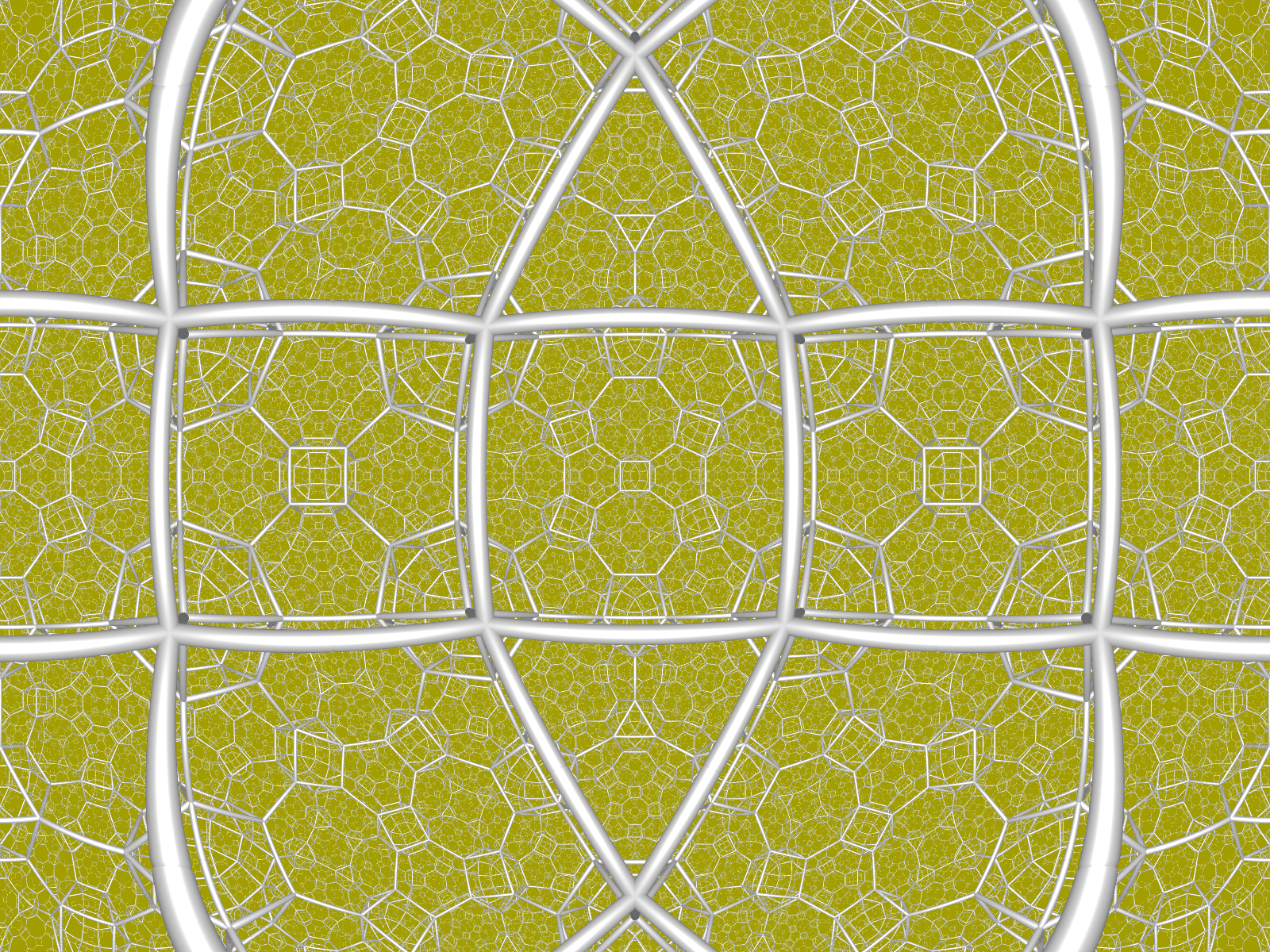

Perspective view from center of rhombicuboctahedron

=== Omnitruncated cubic-octahedral honeycomb ===
Omnitruncated cubic-octahedral honeycomb
Type	Compact uniform honeycomb
Schläfli symbol	tr{(4,3,4,3)}
Coxeter diagrams	
Cells	tr{3,4}
Faces	square {4} hexagon {6} octagon {8}
Vertex figure	Rhombic disphenoid
Coxeter group	[2[(4,3)^{[2]}]] or [(2,2)^{+}[(4,3)^{[2]}]],
Properties	Vertex-transitive, edge-transitive, cell-transitive

The omnitruncated cubic-octahedral honeycomb is a compact uniform honeycomb, constructed from truncated cuboctahedron cells, in a rhombic disphenoid vertex figure. It has a Coxeter diagram with [2,2]^{+} (order 4) extended symmetry in its rhombic disphenoid vertex figure.

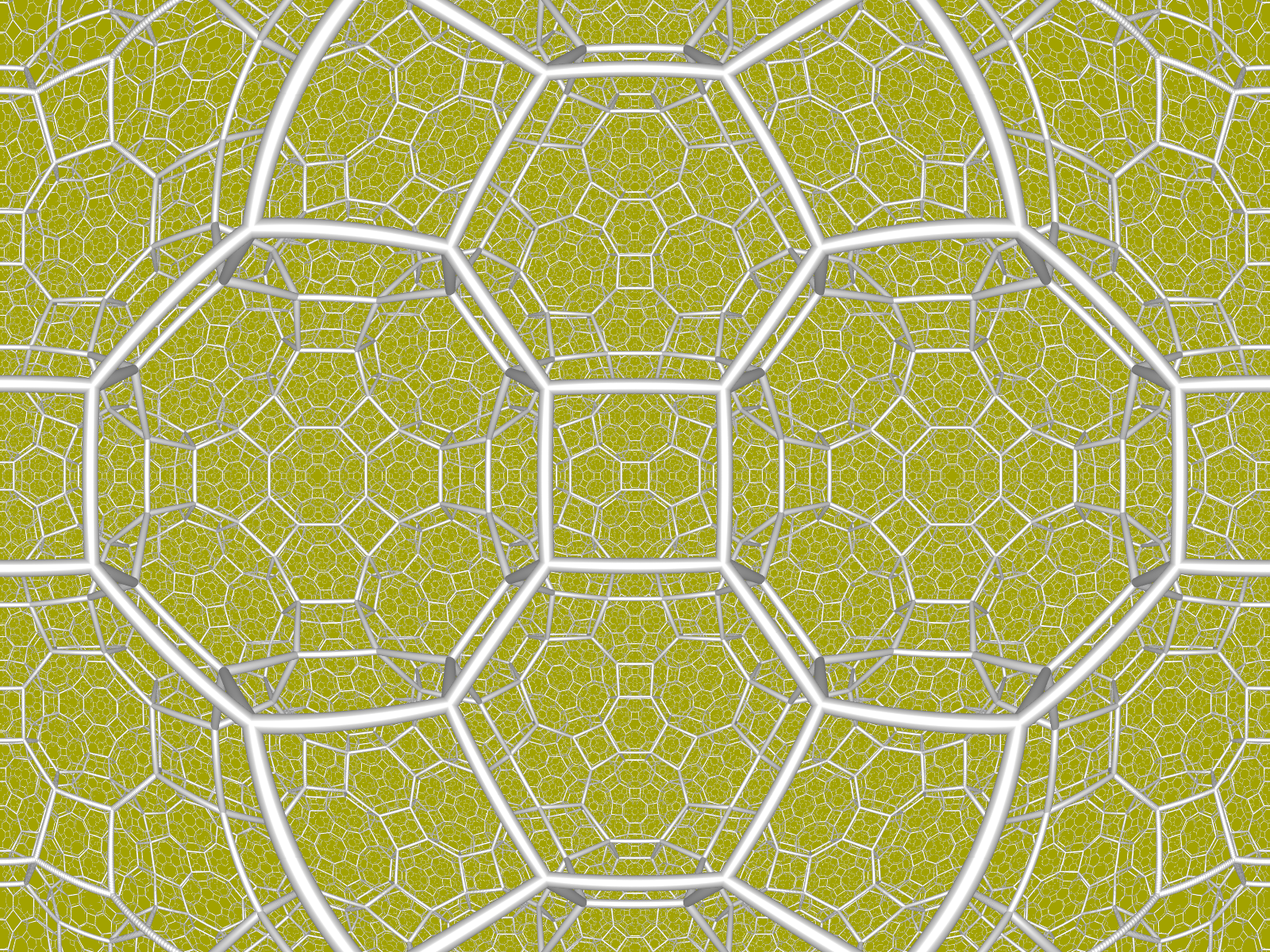

Perspective view from center of truncated cuboctahedron

== See also ==
- Convex uniform honeycombs in hyperbolic space
- List of regular polytopes
