= Order-4-5 square honeycomb =

Order-4-5 square honeycomb
Type	Regular honeycomb		
Schläfli symbols	{4,4,5}		
Coxeter diagrams			
Cells	{4,4}	Faces	{4}
Edge figure	{5}		
Vertex figure	{4,5}		
Dual	{5,4,4}		
Coxeter group	[4,4,5]		
Properties	Regular		

In the geometry of hyperbolic 3-space, the order-4-5 square honeycomb is a regular space-filling tessellation (or honeycomb) with Schläfli symbol {4,4,5}. It has five square tiling {4,4} around each edge. All vertices are ultra-ideal (existing beyond the ideal boundary) with infinitely many square tiling existing around each vertex in an order-5 square tiling vertex arrangement.

== Images ==
Poincaré disk model	Ideal surface

== Related polytopes and honeycombs ==
It a part of a sequence of regular polychora and honeycombs with square tiling cells: {4,4,p}

{4,4,p} honeycombs
Space	E^{3}	H^{3}				
Form	Affine	Paracompact		Noncompact		
Name	{4,4,2}	{4,4,3}	{4,4,4}	{4,4,5}	{4,4,6}	...{4,4,∞}
Coxeter						
Image						
Vertex figure	{4,2}	{4,3}	{4,4}	{4,5}	{4,6}	{4,∞}

=== Order-4-6 square honeycomb ===
Order-4-6 square honeycomb
Type	Regular honeycomb
Schläfli symbols	{4,4,6} {4,(4,3,4)}
Coxeter diagrams	=
Cells	{4,4}
Faces	{4}
Edge figure	{6}
Vertex figure	{4,6} {(4,3,4)}
Dual	{6,4,4}
Coxeter group	[4,4,6] [4,((4,3,4))]
Properties	Regular

In the geometry of hyperbolic 3-space, the order-4-6 square honeycomb is a regular space-filling tessellation (or honeycomb) with Schläfli symbol {4,4,6}. It has six square tiling, {4,4}, around each edge. All vertices are ultra-ideal (existing beyond the ideal boundary) with infinitely many square tiling existing around each vertex in an order-6 square tiling vertex arrangement.

Poincaré disk model	Ideal surface

It has a second construction as a uniform honeycomb, Schläfli symbol {4,(4,3,4)}, Coxeter diagram,, with alternating types or colors of square tiling cells. In Coxeter notation the half symmetry is [4,4,6,1^{+}] = [4,((4,3,4))].

=== Order-4-infinite square honeycomb ===
Order-4-infinite square honeycomb
Type	Regular honeycomb
Schläfli symbols	{4,4,∞} {4,(4,∞,4)}
Coxeter diagrams	=
Cells	{4,4}
Faces	{4}
Edge figure	{∞}
Vertex figure	{4,∞} {(4,∞,4)}
Dual	{∞,4,4}
Coxeter group	[∞,4,3] [4,((4,∞,4))]
Properties	Regular

In the geometry of hyperbolic 3-space, the order-4-infinite square honeycomb is a regular space-filling tessellation (or honeycomb) with Schläfli symbol {4,4,∞}. It has infinitely many square tiling, {4,4}, around each edge. All vertices are ultra-ideal (existing beyond the ideal boundary) with infinitely many square tiling existing around each vertex in an infinite-order square tiling vertex arrangement.

Poincaré disk model	Ideal surface

It has a second construction as a uniform honeycomb, Schläfli symbol {4,(4,∞,4)}, Coxeter diagram, =, with alternating types or colors of square tiling cells. In Coxeter notation the half symmetry is [4,4,∞,1^{+}] = [4,((4,∞,4))].

== See also ==
- Convex uniform honeycombs in hyperbolic space
- List of regular polytopes
