= Order-4-4 pentagonal honeycomb =

Order-4-4 pentagonal honeycomb
Type	Regular honeycomb
Schläfli symbol	{5,4,4} {5,4^{1,1}}
Coxeter diagram	
Cells	{5,4}
Faces	{5}
Vertex figure	{4,4}
Dual	{4,4,5}
Coxeter group	[5,4,4] [5,4^{1,1}]
Properties	Regular

In the geometry of hyperbolic 3-space, the order-4-4 pentagonal honeycomb a regular space-filling tessellation (or honeycomb). Each infinite cell consists of a pentagonal tiling whose vertices lie on a 2-hypercycle, each of which has a limiting circle on the ideal sphere.

== Geometry ==
The Schläfli symbol of the order-4-4 pentagonal honeycomb is {5,4,4}, with four order-4 pentagonal tilings meeting at each edge. The vertex figure of this honeycomb is a square tiling, {4,4}.

Poincaré disk model	Ideal surface

== Related polytopes and honeycombs ==
It is a part of a series of regular polytopes and honeycombs with {p,4,4} Schläfli symbol, and square tiling vertex figures:

{p,4,4} honeycombs
Space	E^{3}	H^{3}				
Form	Affine	Paracompact		Noncompact		
Name	{2,4,4}	{3,4,4}	{4,4,4}	{5,4,4}	{6,4,4}	..{∞,4,4}
Coxeter						
Image						
Cells	{2,4}	{3,4}	{4,4}	{5,4}	{6,4}	{∞,4}

=== Order-4-4 hexagonal honeycomb ===
Order-4-4 hexagonal honeycomb
Type	Regular honeycomb
Schläfli symbol	{6,4,4} {6,4^{1,1}}
Coxeter diagram	
Cells	{6,4}
Faces	{6}
Vertex figure	{4,4}
Dual	{4,4,6}
Coxeter group	[6,4,4] [6,4^{1,1}]
Properties	Regular

In the geometry of hyperbolic 3-space, the order-4-4 hexagonal honeycomb a regular space-filling tessellation (or honeycomb). Each infinite cell consists of an order-4 hexagonal tiling whose vertices lie on a 2-hypercycle, each of which has a limiting circle on the ideal sphere.

The Schläfli symbol of the octagonal tiling honeycomb is {6,4,4}, with three octagonal tilings meeting at each edge. The vertex figure of this honeycomb is a square tiling, {4,4}.

Poincaré disk model	Ideal surface

=== Order-4-4 apeirogonal honeycomb ===
Order-4-4 apeirogonal honeycomb
Type	Regular honeycomb
Schläfli symbol	{∞,4,4} {∞,4^{1,1}}
Coxeter diagram	
Cells	{∞,4}
Faces	{∞}
Vertex figure	{4,4}
Dual	{4,4,∞}
Coxeter group	[∞,4,4] [∞,4^{1,1}]
Properties	Regular

In the geometry of hyperbolic 3-space, the order-4-4 apeirogonal honeycomb a regular space-filling tessellation (or honeycomb). Each infinite cell consists of an order-4 apeirogonal tiling whose vertices lie on a 2-hypercycle, each of which has a limiting circle on the ideal sphere.

The Schläfli symbol of the apeirogonal tiling honeycomb is {∞,4,4}, with three order-4 apeirogonal tilings meeting at each edge. The vertex figure of this honeycomb is a square tiling, {4,4}.

Poincaré disk model	Ideal surface

== See also ==
- Convex uniform honeycombs in hyperbolic space
- List of regular polytopes
