= Order-4 square tiling honeycomb =

Order-4 square tiling honeycomb
Type	Hyperbolic regular honeycomb Paracompact uniform honeycomb
Schläfli symbols	{4,4,4} h{4,4,4} ↔ {4,4^{1,1}} {4^{[4]}}
Coxeter diagrams	↔ ↔ ↔ ↔ ↔ ↔ ↔ ↔ ↔
Cells	{4,4}
Faces	square {4}
Edge figure	square {4}
Vertex figure	square tiling, {4,4}
Dual	Self-dual
Coxeter groups	$\overline{N}_3$, [4,4,4] $\overline{M}_3$, [4^{1,1,1}] $\widehat{RR}_3$, [4^{[4]}]
Properties	Regular, quasiregular

In the geometry of hyperbolic 3-space, the order-4 square tiling honeycomb is one of 11 paracompact regular honeycombs. It is paracompact because it has infinite cells and vertex figures, with all vertices as ideal points at infinity. Given by Schläfli symbol {4,4,4}, it has four square tilings around each edge, and infinite square tilings around each vertex in a square tiling vertex figure.

A geometric honeycomb is a space-filling of polyhedral or higher-dimensional cells, so that there are no gaps. It is an example of the more general mathematical tiling or tessellation in any number of dimensions.

Honeycombs are usually constructed in ordinary Euclidean ("flat") space, like the convex uniform honeycombs. They may also be constructed in non-Euclidean spaces, such as hyperbolic uniform honeycombs. Any finite uniform polytope can be projected to its circumsphere to form a uniform honeycomb in spherical space.

== Symmetry ==
The order-4 square tiling honeycomb has many reflective symmetry constructions: as a regular honeycomb, ↔ with alternating types (colors) of square tilings, and with 3 types (colors) of square tilings in a ratio of 2:1:1.

Two more half symmetry constructions with pyramidal domains have [4,4,1^{+},4] symmetry: ↔, and ↔.

There are two high-index subgroups, both index 8: [4,4,4^{*}] ↔ [(4,4,4,4,1^{+})], with a pyramidal fundamental domain: [((4,∞,4)),((4,∞,4))] or; and [4,4^{*},4], with 4 orthogonal sets of ultra-parallel mirrors in an octahedral fundamental domain:.

== Images ==
The order-4 square tiling honeycomb is analogous to the 2D hyperbolic infinite-order apeirogonal tiling, {∞,∞}, with infinite apeirogonal faces, and with all vertices on the ideal surface.

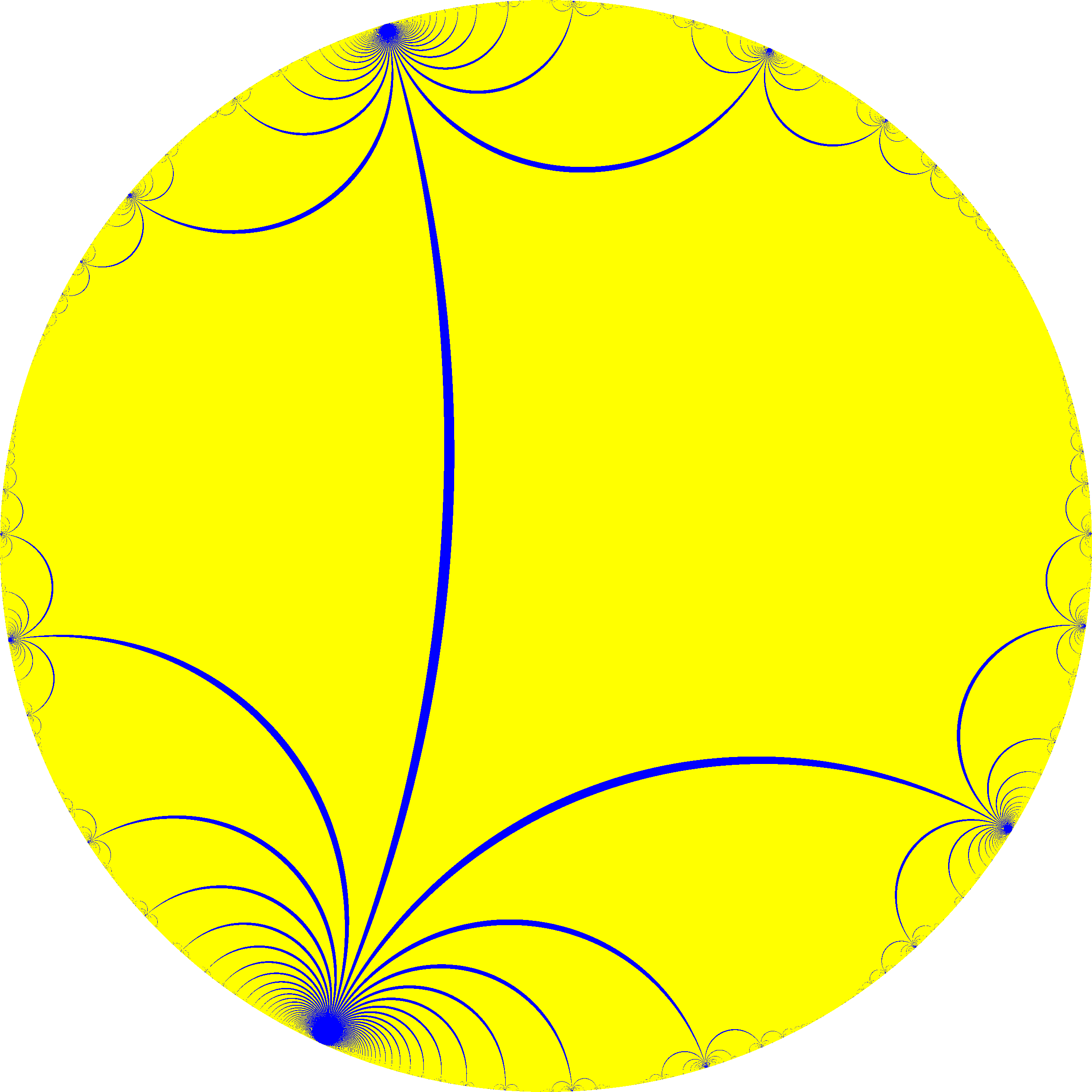

It contains and that tile 2-hypercycle surfaces, which are similar to these paracompact order-4 apeirogonal tilings:

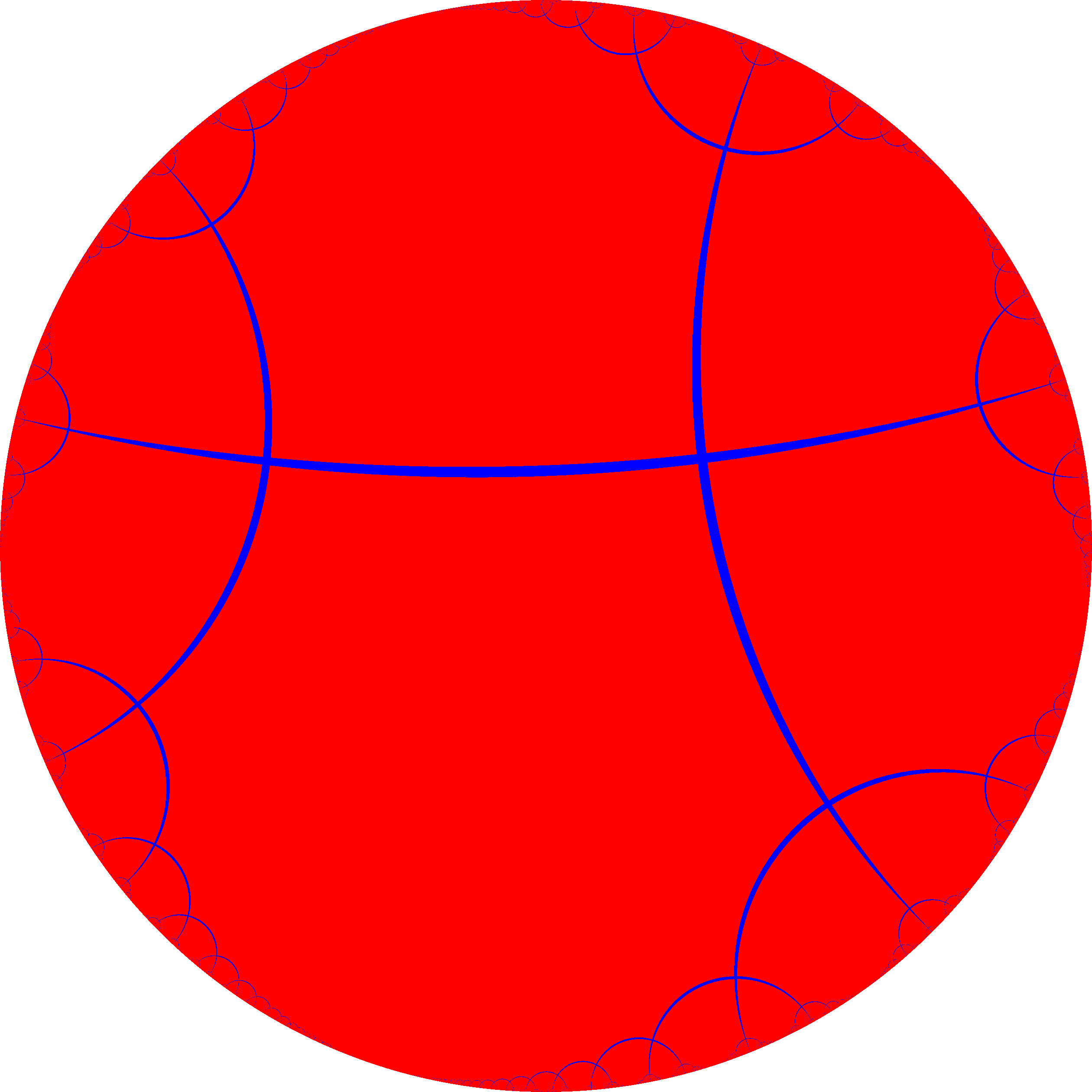
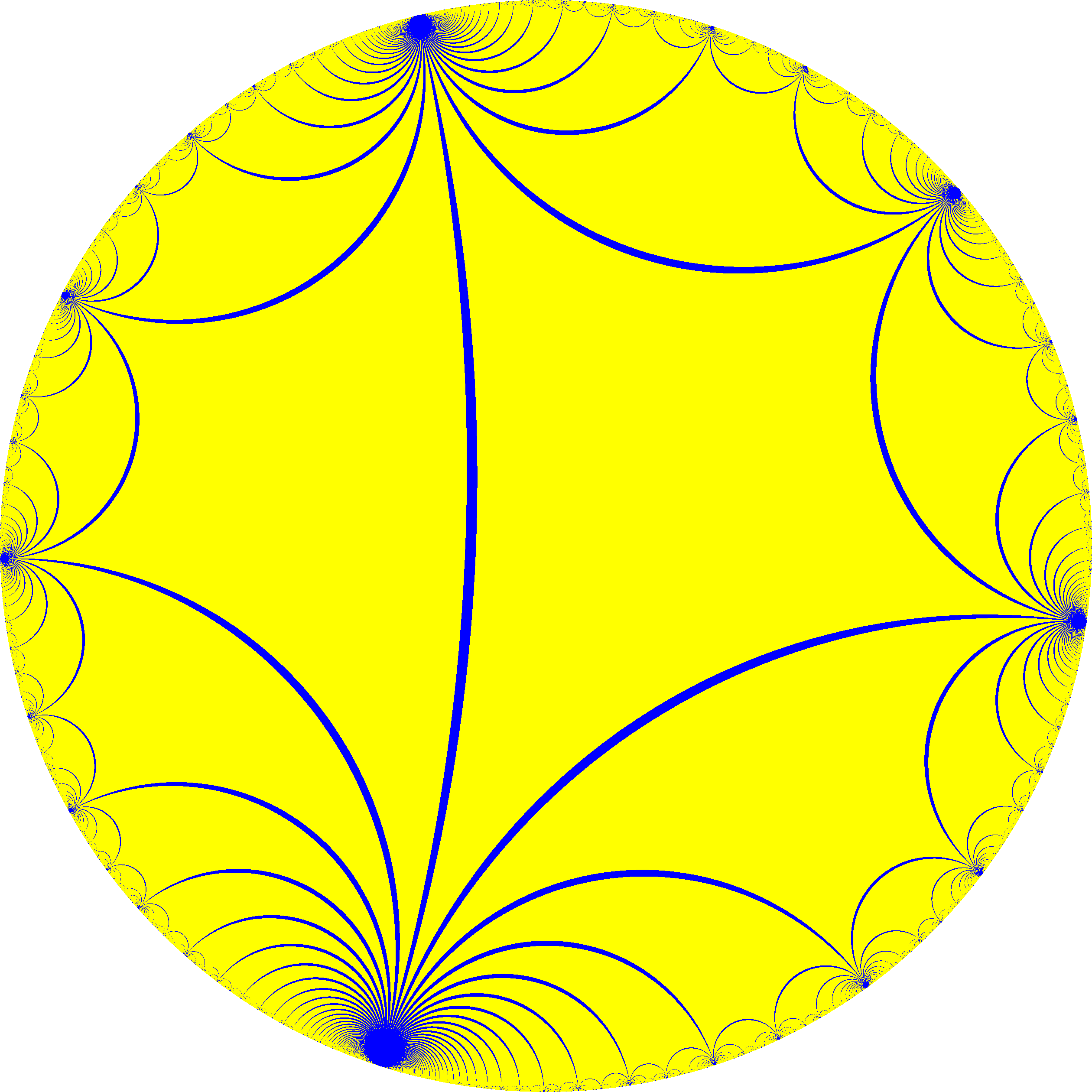

== Related polytopes and honeycombs ==
The order-4 square tiling honeycomb is a regular hyperbolic honeycomb in 3-space. It is one of eleven regular paracompact honeycombs.

11 paracompact regular honeycombs
{6,3,3}	{6,3,4}	{6,3,5}	{6,3,6}	{4,4,3}	{4,4,4}
{3,3,6}	{4,3,6}	{5,3,6}	{3,6,3}	{3,4,4}	

There are nine uniform honeycombs in the [4,4,4] Coxeter group family, including this regular form.

[4,4,4] family honeycombs
{4,4,4}	r{4,4,4}	t{4,4,4}	rr{4,4,4}	t_{0,3}{4,4,4}	2t{4,4,4}	tr{4,4,4}	t_{0,1,3}{4,4,4}	t_{0,1,2,3}{4,4,4}

It is part of a sequence of honeycombs with a square tiling vertex figure:

{p,4,4} honeycombs
Space	E^{3}	H^{3}				
Form	Affine	Paracompact		Noncompact		
Name	{2,4,4}	{3,4,4}	{4,4,4}	{5,4,4}	{6,4,4}	..{∞,4,4}
Coxeter						
Image						
Cells	{2,4}	{3,4}	{4,4}	{5,4}	{6,4}	{∞,4}

It is part of a sequence of honeycombs with square tiling cells:

{4,4,p} honeycombs
Space	E^{3}	H^{3}				
Form	Affine	Paracompact		Noncompact		
Name	{4,4,2}	{4,4,3}	{4,4,4}	{4,4,5}	{4,4,6}	...{4,4,∞}
Coxeter						
Image						
Vertex figure	{4,2}	{4,3}	{4,4}	{4,5}	{4,6}	{4,∞}

It is part of a sequence of quasiregular polychora and honeycombs:

Quasiregular polychora and honeycombs: h{4,p,q}
Space	Finite	Affine	Compact	Paracompact		
Schläfli symbol	h{4,3,3}	h{4,3,4}	h{4,3,5}	h{4,3,6}	h{4,4,3}	h{4,4,4}
Schläfli symbol	$\left\{3,{3\atop3}\right\}$	$\left\{3,{4\atop3}\right\}$	$\left\{3,{5\atop3}\right\}$	$\left\{3,{6\atop3}\right\}$	$\left\{4,{4\atop3}\right\}$	$\left\{4,{4\atop4}\right\}$
Coxeter diagram	↔	↔	↔	↔	↔	↔
Coxeter diagram	↔					↔
Image						
Vertex figure r{p,3}						

=== Rectified order-4 square tiling honeycomb ===
Rectified order-4 square tiling honeycomb
Type	Paracompact uniform honeycomb
Schläfli symbols	r{4,4,4} or t_{1}{4,4,4}
Coxeter diagrams	↔
Cells	{4,4} r{4,4}
Faces	square {4}
Vertex figure	cube
Coxeter groups	$\overline{N}_3$, [4,4,4] $\overline{M}_3$, [4^{1,1,1}]
Properties	Quasiregular or regular, depending on symmetry

The rectified order-4 hexagonal tiling honeycomb, t_{1}{4,4,4}, has square tiling facets, with a cubic vertex figure. It is the same as the regular square tiling honeycomb, {4,4,3},.

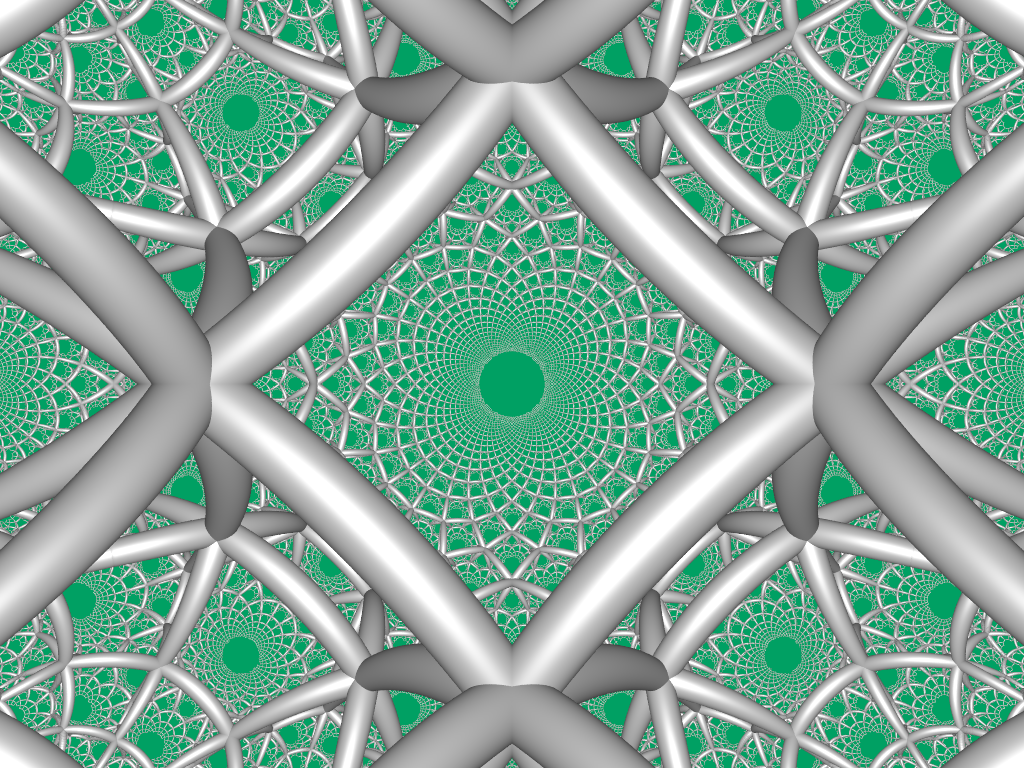

=== Truncated order-4 square tiling honeycomb ===
Truncated order-4 square tiling honeycomb
Type	Paracompact uniform honeycomb
Schläfli symbols	t{4,4,4} or t_{0,1}{4,4,4}
Coxeter diagrams	↔ ↔ ↔
Cells	{4,4} t{4,4}
Faces	square {4} octagon {8}
Vertex figure	square pyramid
Coxeter groups	$\overline{N}_3$, [4,4,4] $\overline{M}_3$, [4^{1,1,1}]
Properties	Vertex-transitive

The truncated order-4 square tiling honeycomb, t_{0,1}{4,4,4}, has square tiling and truncated square tiling facets, with a square pyramid vertex figure.

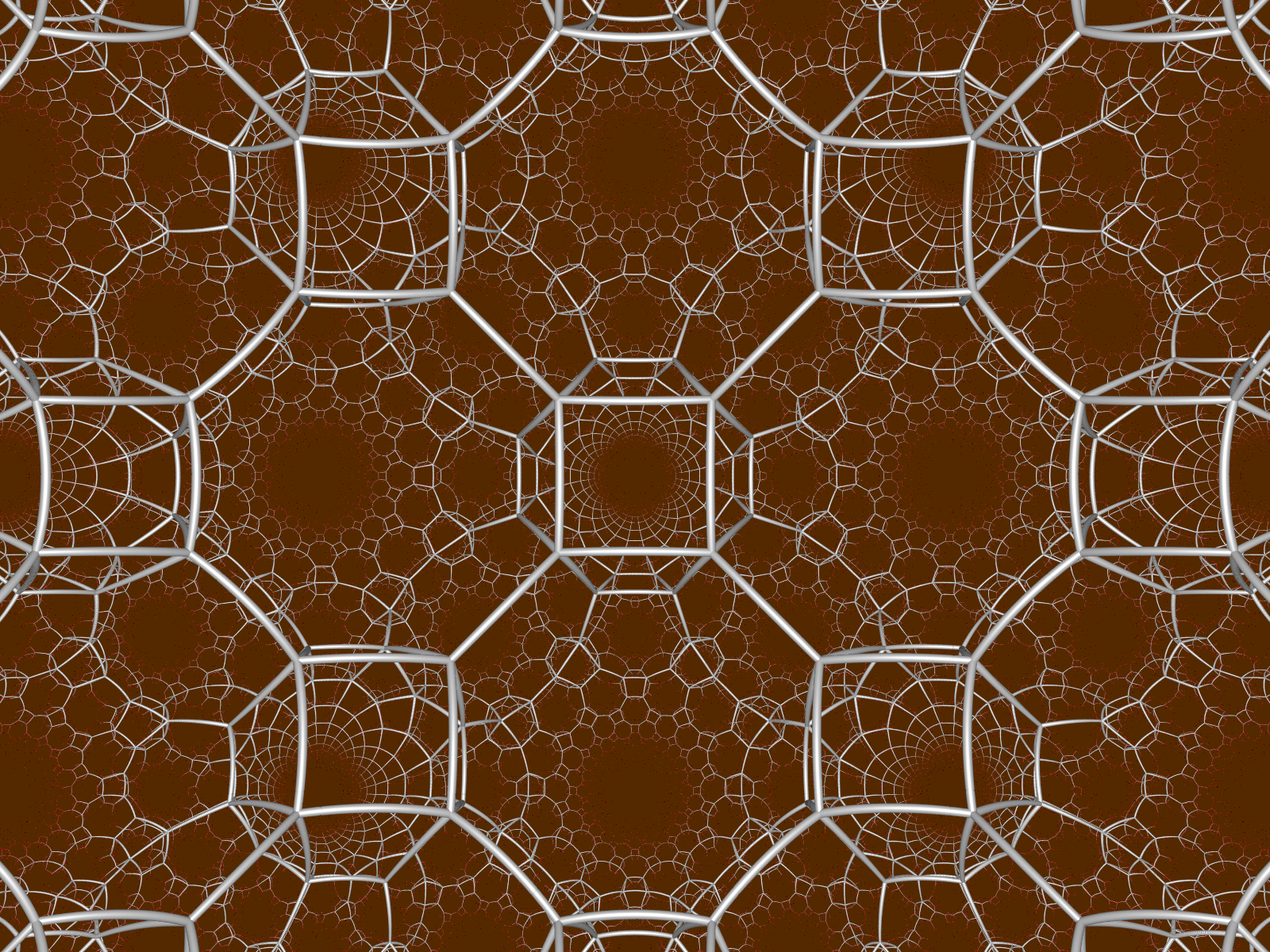

=== Bitruncated order-4 square tiling honeycomb ===
Bitruncated order-4 square tiling honeycomb
Type	Paracompact uniform honeycomb
Schläfli symbols	2t{4,4,4} or t_{1,2}{4,4,4}
Coxeter diagrams	↔ ↔ ↔
Cells	t{4,4}
Faces	square {4} octagon {8}
Vertex figure	tetragonal disphenoid
Coxeter groups	$2\times\overline{N}_3$, [[4,4,4]] $\overline{M}_3$, [4^{1,1,1}] $\widehat{RR}_3$, [4^{[4]}]
Properties	Vertex-transitive, edge-transitive, cell-transitive

The bitruncated order-4 square tiling honeycomb, t_{1,2}{4,4,4}, has truncated square tiling facets, with a tetragonal disphenoid vertex figure.

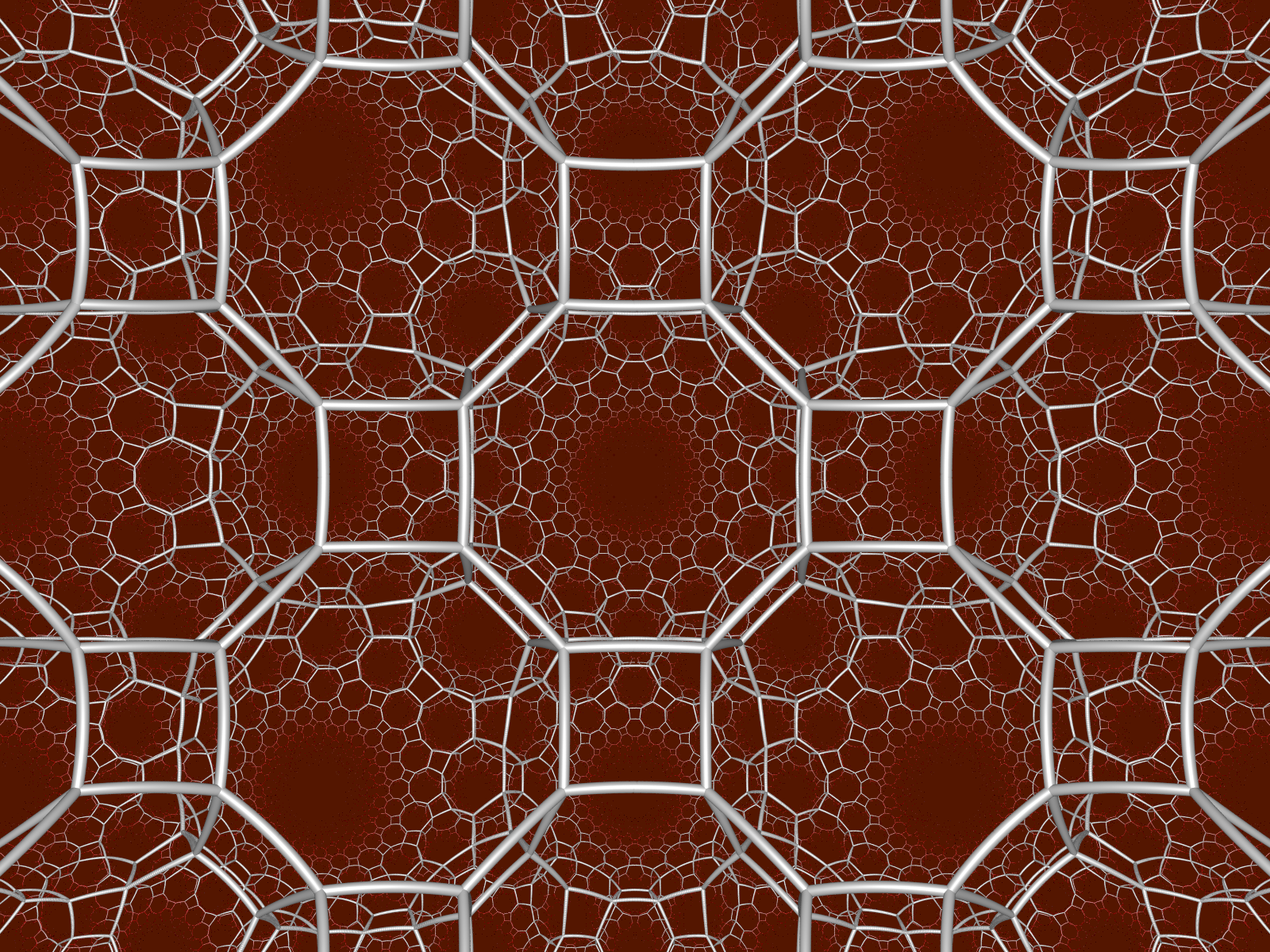

=== Cantellated order-4 square tiling honeycomb ===
Cantellated order-4 square tiling honeycomb
Type	Paracompact uniform honeycomb
Schläfli symbols	rr{4,4,4} or t_{0,2}{4,4,4}
Coxeter diagrams	
Cells	{}x{4} r{4,4} rr{4,4}
Faces	square {4}
Vertex figure	triangular prism
Coxeter groups	$\overline{N}_3$, [4,4,4] $\overline{R}_3$, [3,4,4]
Properties	Vertex-transitive, edge-transitive

The cantellated order-4 square tiling honeycomb, is the same thing as the rectified square tiling honeycomb,. It has cube and square tiling facets, with a triangular prism vertex figure.

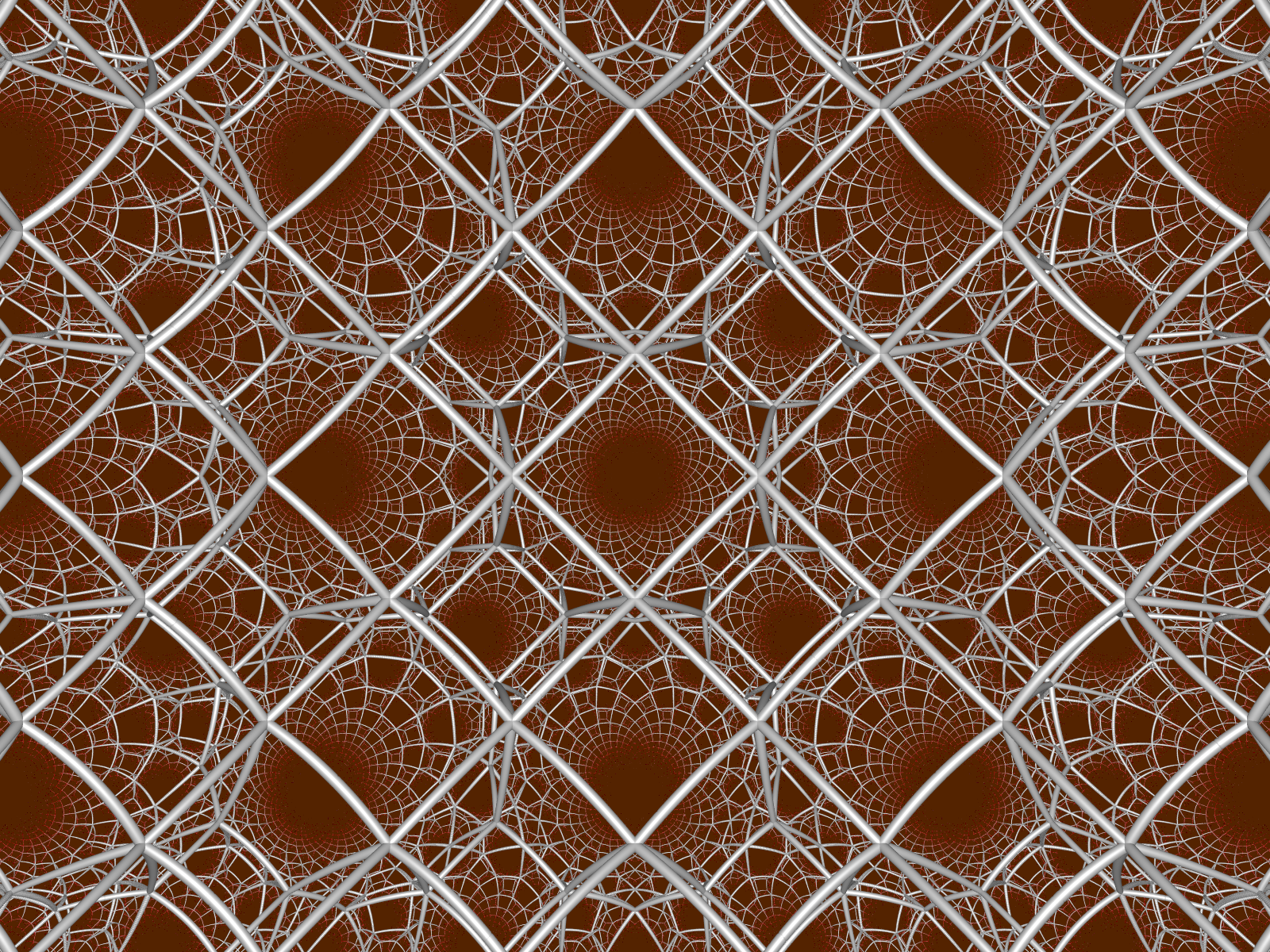

=== Cantitruncated order-4 square tiling honeycomb ===
Cantitruncated order-4 square tiling honeycomb
Type	Paracompact uniform honeycomb
Schläfli symbols	tr{4,4,4} or t_{0,1,2}{4,4,4}
Coxeter diagrams	↔
Cells	{}x{4} tr{4,4} t{4,4}
Faces	square {4} octagon {8}
Vertex figure	mirrored sphenoid
Coxeter groups	$\overline{N}_3$, [4,4,4] $\overline{R}_3$, [3,4,4] $\overline{M}_3$, [4^{1,1,1}]
Properties	Vertex-transitive

The cantitruncated order-4 square tiling honeycomb, is the same as the truncated square tiling honeycomb,. It contains cube and truncated square tiling facets, with a mirrored sphenoid vertex figure.

It is the same as the truncated square tiling honeycomb,.

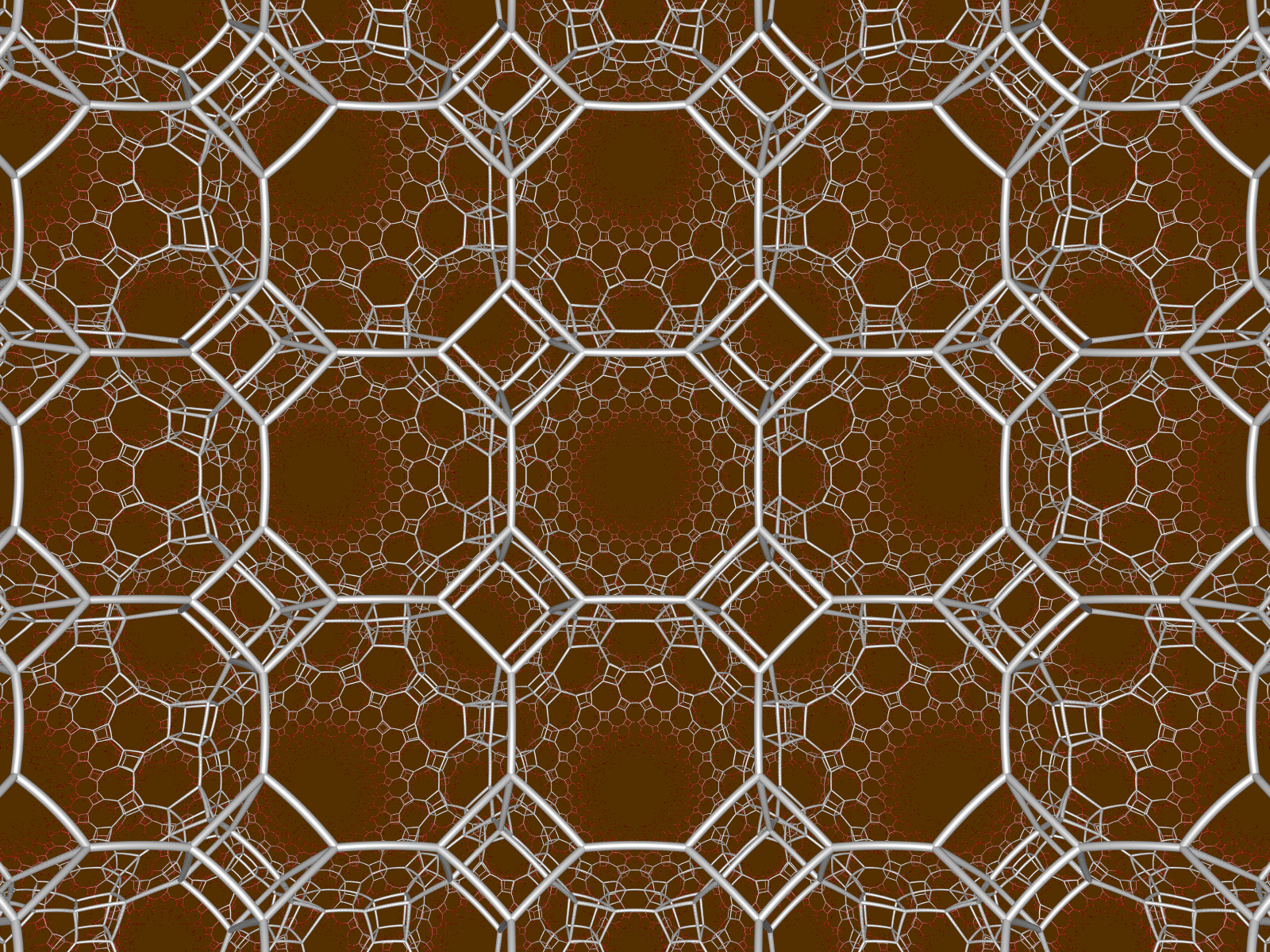

=== Runcinated order-4 square tiling honeycomb ===
Runcinated order-4 square tiling honeycomb
Type	Paracompact uniform honeycomb
Schläfli symbols	t_{0,3}{4,4,4}
Coxeter diagrams	↔ ↔
Cells	{4,4} {}x{4}
Faces	square {4}
Vertex figure	square antiprism
Coxeter groups	$2\times\overline{N}_3$, [[4,4,4]]
Properties	Vertex-transitive, edge-transitive

The runcinated order-4 square tiling honeycomb, t_{0,3}{4,4,4}, has square tiling and cube facets, with a square antiprism vertex figure.

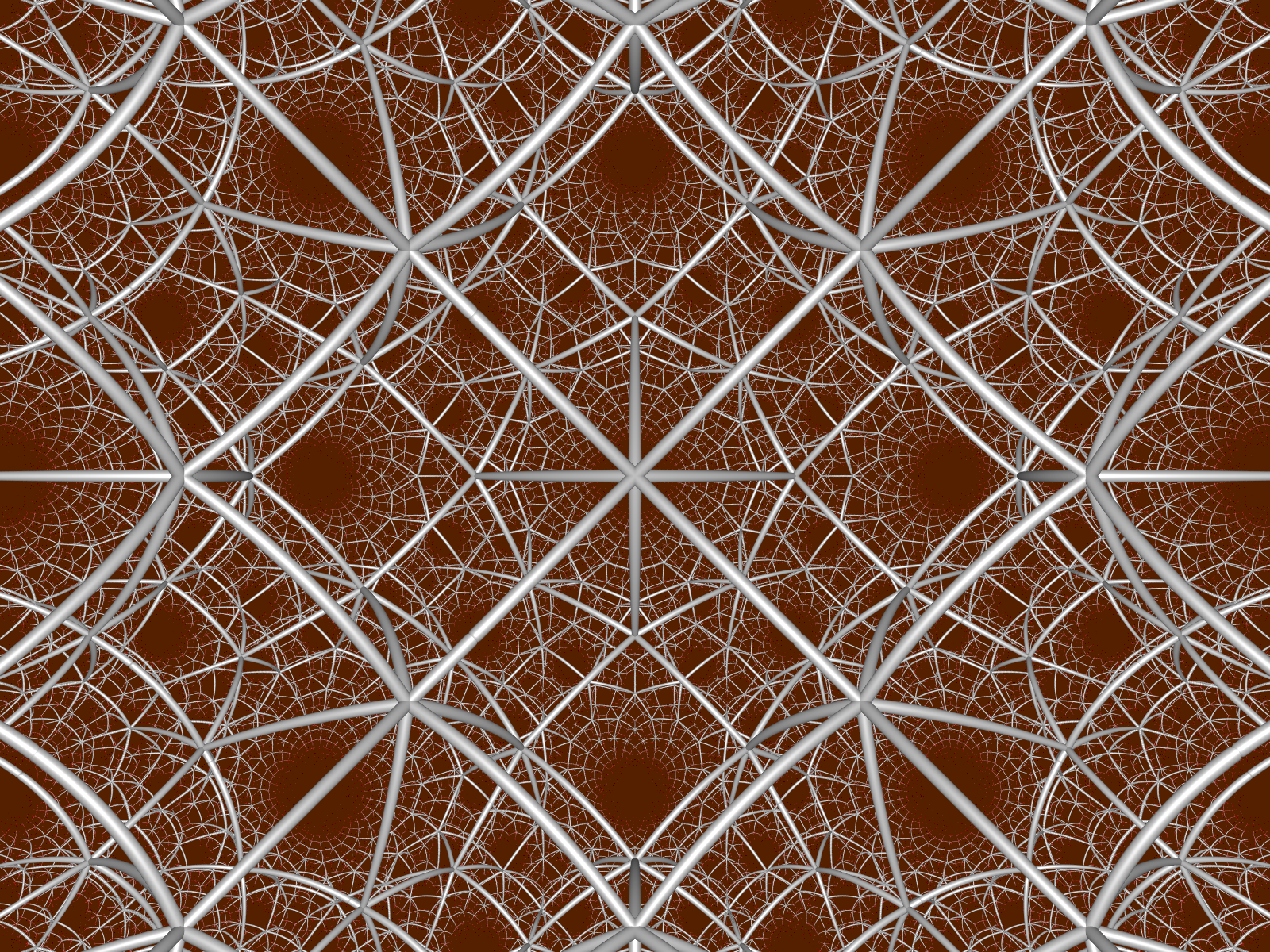

=== Runcitruncated order-4 square tiling honeycomb ===
Runcitruncated order-4 square tiling honeycomb
Type	Paracompact uniform honeycomb
Schläfli symbols	t_{0,1,3}{4,4,4}
Coxeter diagrams	↔
Cells	t{4,4} rr{4,4} {}x{4} {8}x{}
Faces	square {4} octagon {8}
Vertex figure	square pyramid
Coxeter groups	$\overline{N}_3$, [4,4,4]
Properties	Vertex-transitive

The runcitruncated order-4 square tiling honeycomb, t_{0,1,3}{4,4,4}, has square tiling, truncated square tiling, cube, and octagonal prism facets, with a square pyramid vertex figure.

The runcicantellated order-4 square tiling honeycomb is equivalent to the runcitruncated order-4 square tiling honeycomb.

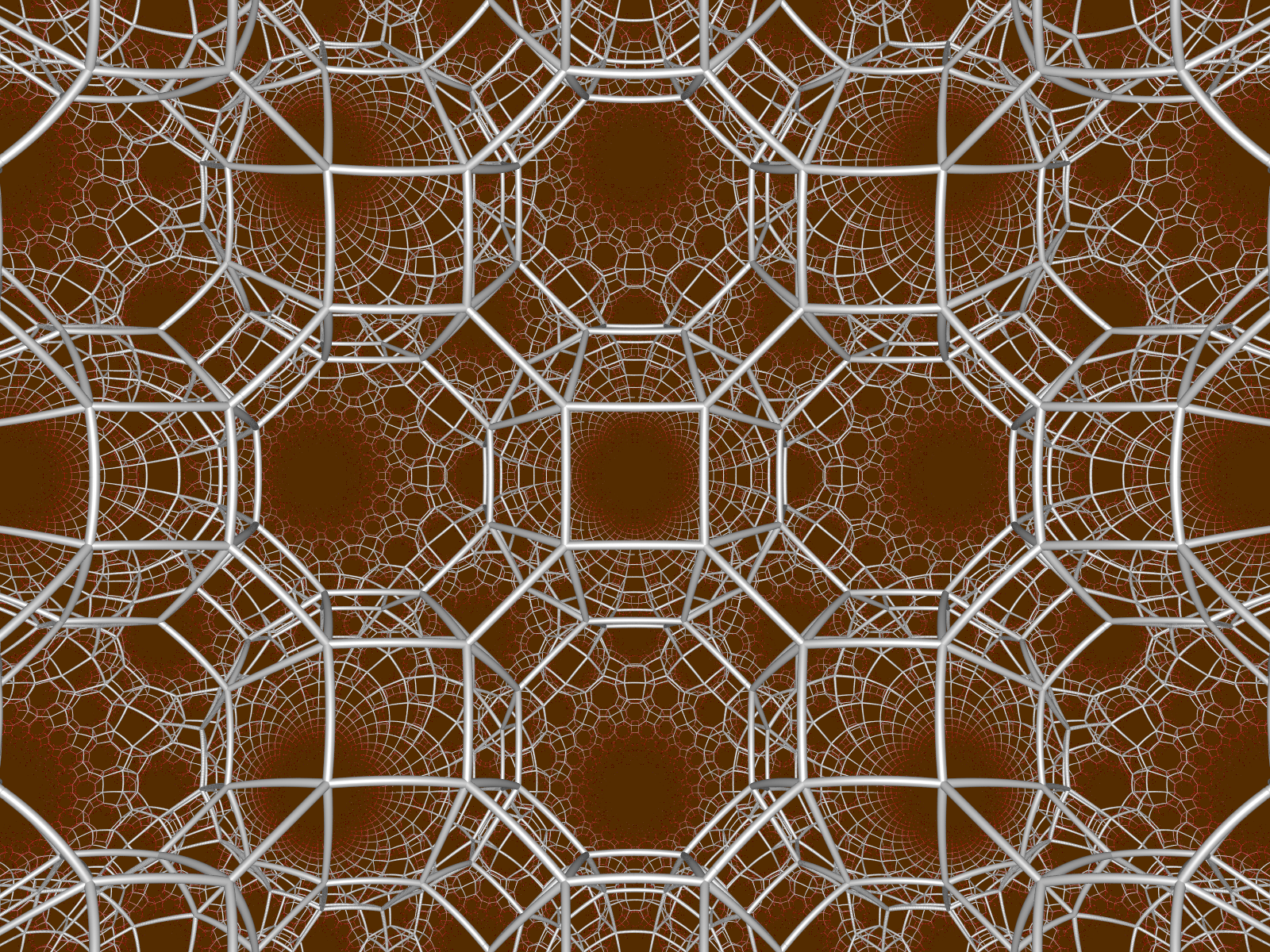

=== Omnitruncated order-4 square tiling honeycomb ===
Omnitruncated order-4 square tiling honeycomb
Type	Paracompact uniform honeycomb
Schläfli symbols	t_{0,1,2,3}{4,4,4}
Coxeter diagrams	
Cells	tr{4,4} {8}x{}
Faces	square {4} octagon {8}
Vertex figure	digonal disphenoid
Coxeter groups	$2\times\overline{N}_3$, [[4,4,4]]
Properties	Vertex-transitive

The omnitruncated order-4 square tiling honeycomb, t_{0,1,2,3}{4,4,4}, has truncated square tiling and octagonal prism facets, with a digonal disphenoid vertex figure.

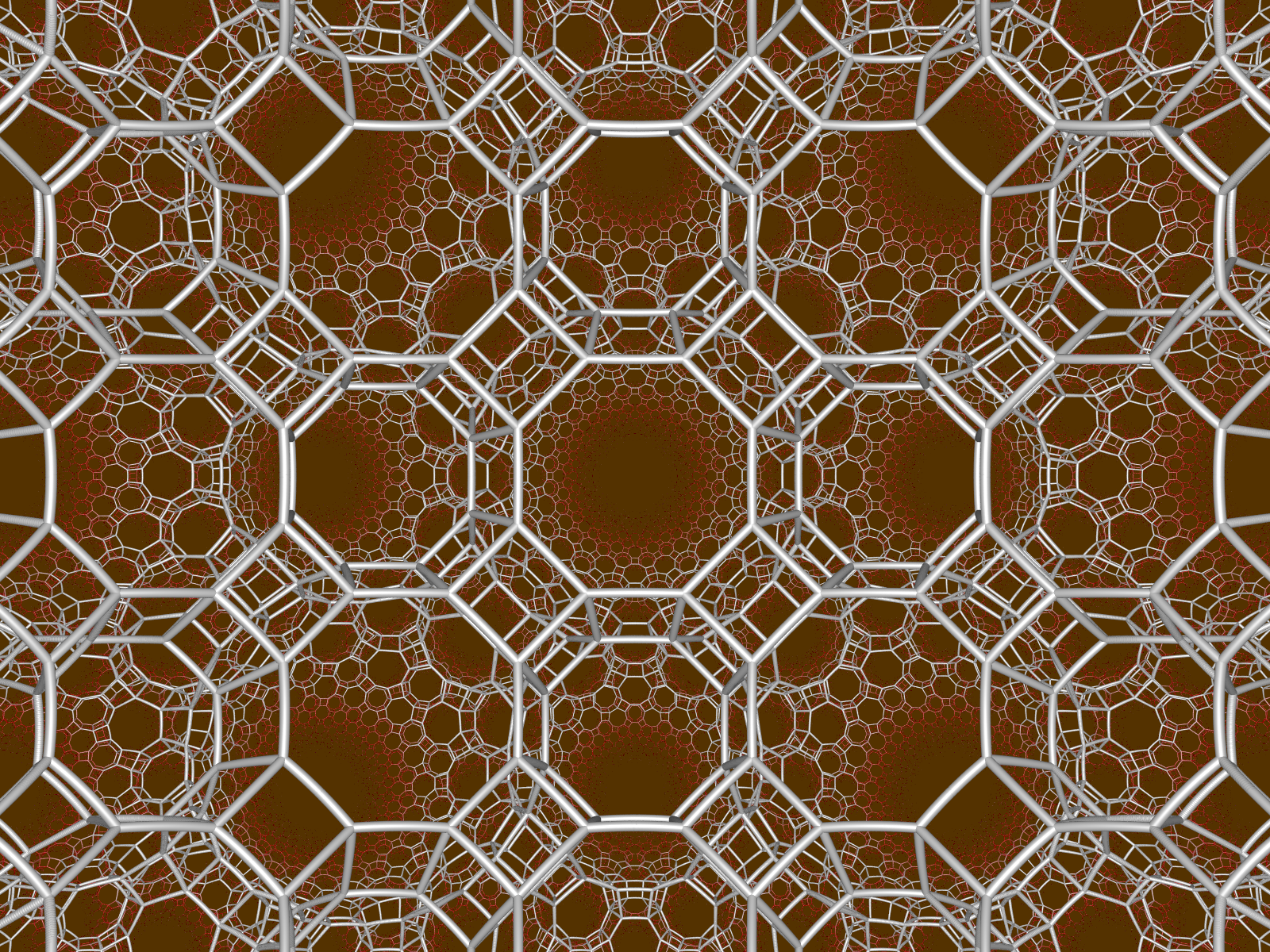

=== Alternated order-4 square tiling honeycomb ===
The alternated order-4 square tiling honeycomb is a lower-symmetry construction of the order-4 square tiling honeycomb itself.

=== Cantic order-4 square tiling honeycomb ===
The cantic order-4 square tiling honeycomb is a lower-symmetry construction of the truncated order-4 square tiling honeycomb.

=== Runcic order-4 square tiling honeycomb ===
The runcic order-4 square tiling honeycomb is a lower-symmetry construction of the order-3 square tiling honeycomb.

=== Runcicantic order-4 square tiling honeycomb ===
The runcicantic order-4 square tiling honeycomb is a lower-symmetry construction of the bitruncated order-4 square tiling honeycomb.

=== Quarter order-4 square tiling honeycomb ===
Quarter order-4 square tiling honeycomb
Type	Paracompact uniform honeycomb
Schläfli symbols	q{4,4,4}
Coxeter diagrams	
Cells	t{4,4} {4,4}
Faces	square {4} octagon {8}
Vertex figure	square antiprism
Coxeter groups	$\widehat{RR}_3$, [4^{[4]}]
Properties	Vertex-transitive, edge-transitive

The quarter order-4 square tiling honeycomb, q{4,4,4},, or, has truncated square tiling and square tiling facets, with a square antiprism vertex figure.

== See also ==
- Convex uniform honeycombs in hyperbolic space
- Regular tessellations of hyperbolic 3-space
- Paracompact uniform honeycombs
