= Tiling with rectangles =

Rectangular tilings using various shapes of rectangles

A tiling with rectangles is a tiling which uses rectangles as its parts. The domino tilings are tilings with rectangles of 1 × 2 side ratio. The tilings with straight polyominoes of shapes such as 1 × 3, 1 × 4 and tilings with polyominoes of shapes such as 2 × 3 fall also into this category.

== Congruent rectangles ==
Some tiling of rectangles include:

Stacked bond	Running bond	Basket weave	3×3 Basket weave	Herringbone pattern

== Tilings with non-congruent rectangles ==
The smallest square that can be cut into (m × n) rectangles, such that all m and n are different integers, is the 11 × 11 square, and the tiling uses five rectangles.

The smallest rectangle that can be cut into (m × n) rectangles, such that all m and n are different integers, is the 9 × 13 rectangle, and the tiling uses five rectangles.

== See also ==
- Square tiling
- Squaring the square
- Tessellation
- Tiling puzzle
