= Square tiling =

Regular tiling of the Euclidean plane

- Type: regular tiling
- Tile: square
- Vertex configuration: 4.4.4.4
- Schläfli symbol: $\{4,4\}$
- Wallpaper group: p4m
- Dual: self-dual
- Properties: vertex-transitive, edge-transitive, face-transitive

In geometry, the square tiling, square tessellation or square grid is a regular tiling of the Euclidean plane consisting of four squares around every vertex. John Horton Conway called it a quadrille.

== Structure and properties ==
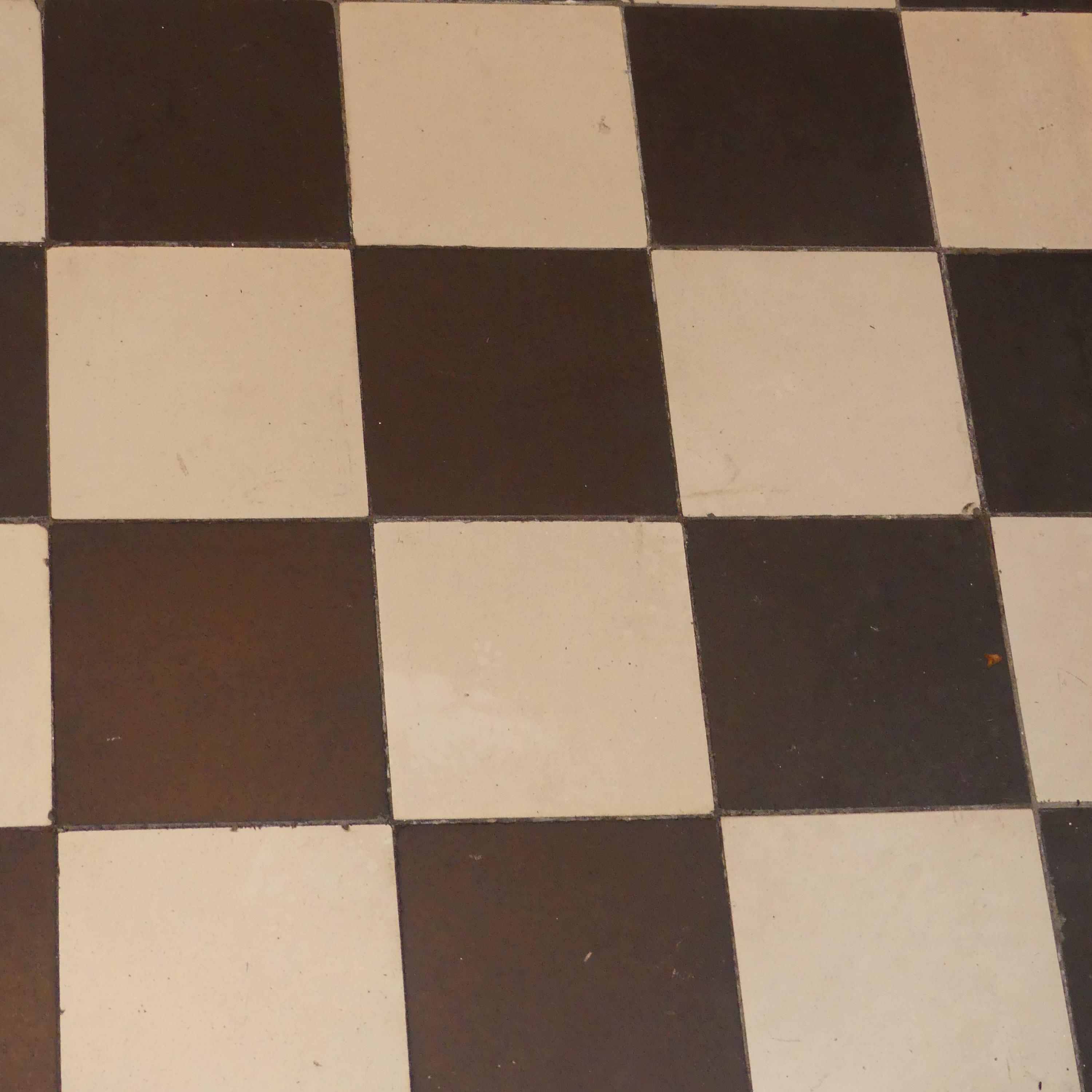
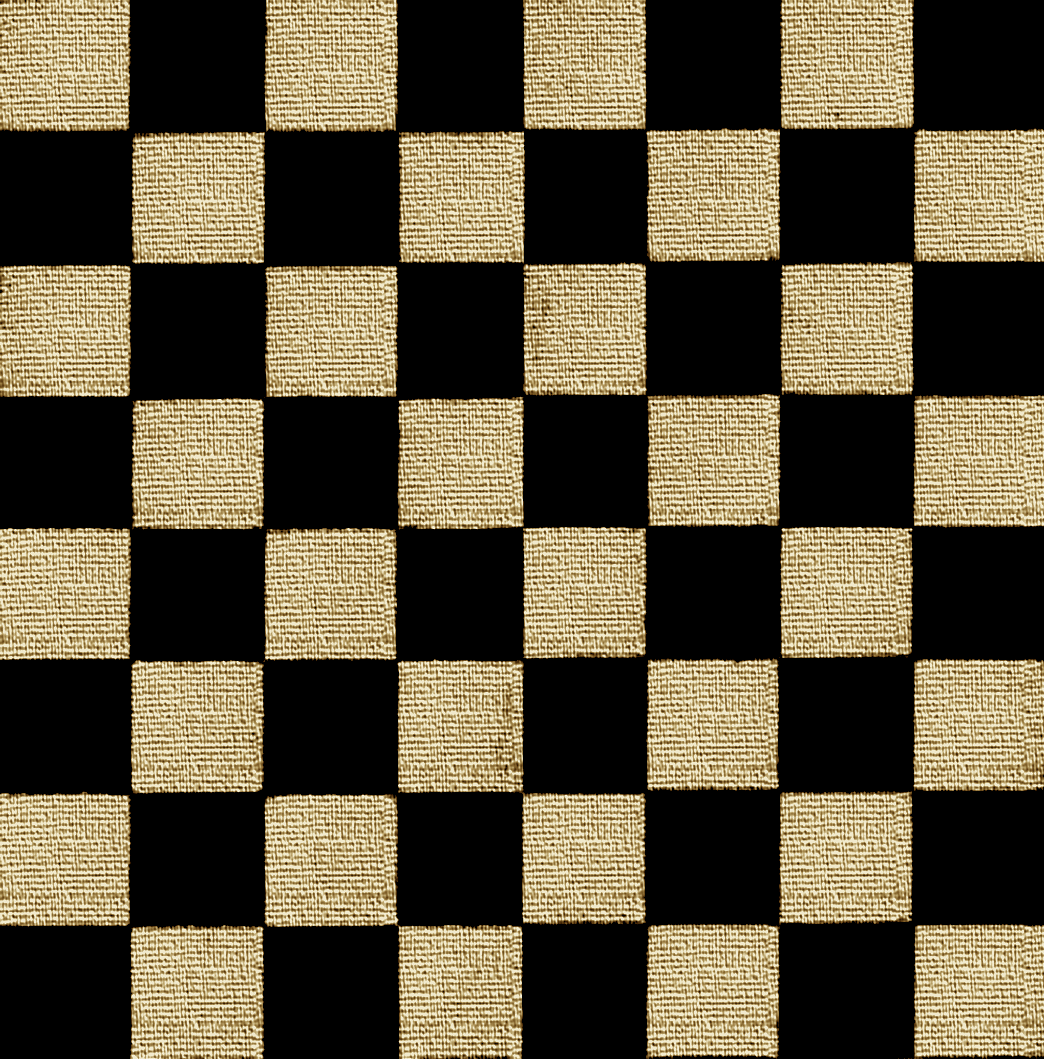
Flooring and game board

The square tiling has a structure consisting of one type of congruent prototile, the square, sharing two vertices with other identical ones. This is an example of monohedral tiling. Each vertex at the tiling is surrounded by four squares, which denotes in a vertex configuration as $4.4.4.4$ or $4^4$. The vertices of a square can be considered as the lattice, so the square tiling can be formed through the square lattice. This tiling is commonly familiar with the flooring and game boards. It is self-dual, meaning the center of each square connects to another of the adjacent tile, forming square tiling itself.

The square tiling acts transitively on the flags of the tiling. In this case, the flag consists of a mutually incident vertex, edge, and tile of the tiling. Simply put, every pair of flags has a symmetry operation mapping the first flag to the second: they are vertex-transitive (mapping the vertex of a tile to another), edge-transitive (mapping the edge to another), and face-transitive (mapping square tile to another). By meeting these three properties, the square tiling is categorized as one of three regular tilings; the remaining being triangular tiling and hexagonal tiling with its prototiles are equilateral triangles and regular hexagons, respectively. The symmetry group of a square tiling is p4m: there is an order-4 dihedral group of a tile and an order-2 dihedral group around the vertex surrounded by four squares lying on the line of reflection.

The square tiling is alternatively formed by the assemblage of infinitely many circles arranged vertically and horizontally, wherein their equal diameter at the center of every point contact with four other circles. Its densest packing is $\frac{\pi}{4} \approx 0.785$.

== Topologically equivalent tilings ==
Isohedral tilings have identical faces (face-transitivity) and vertex-transitivity. There are eighteen variations, with six identified as triangles that do not connect edge-to-edge, or as quadrilateral with two collinear edges. Symmetry given assumes all faces are the same color.

Twelve isohedral quadrilateral tilings, and six triangular tilings that do not tile edge-to-edge

== Related regular complex apeirogons ==
There are 3 regular complex apeirogons, sharing the vertices of the square tiling. Regular complex apeirogons have vertices and edges, where edges can contain 2 or more vertices. Regular apeirogons p{q}r are constrained by: 1/p + 2/q + 1/r = 1. Edges have p vertices, and vertex figures are r-gonal.

Self-dual	Duals	
4{4}4 or	2{8}4 or	4{8}2 or

== See also ==
- Tiling with rectangles
- Fenestrane
- Langton's ant
- OpenStructures, design pattern consisting of four squares around every vertex
- Polyomino

Fundamental convex regular and uniform honeycombs in dimensions 2–9
Space	Family	${\tilde{A}}_{n-1}$	${\tilde{C}}_{n-1}$	${\tilde{B}}_{n-1}$	${\tilde{D}}_{n-1}$	${\tilde{G}}_2$ / ${\tilde{F}}_4$ / ${\tilde{E}}_{n-1}$
E^{2}	Uniform tiling	0_{[3]}	δ_{3}	hδ_{3}	qδ_{3}	Hexagonal
E^{3}	Uniform convex honeycomb	0_{[4]}	δ_{4}	hδ_{4}	qδ_{4}	
E^{4}	Uniform 4-honeycomb	0_{[5]}	δ_{5}	hδ_{5}	qδ_{5}	24-cell honeycomb
E^{5}	Uniform 5-honeycomb	0_{[6]}	δ_{6}	hδ_{6}	qδ_{6}	
E^{6}	Uniform 6-honeycomb	0_{[7]}	δ_{7}	hδ_{7}	qδ_{7}	2_{22}
E^{7}	Uniform 7-honeycomb	0_{[8]}	δ_{8}	hδ_{8}	qδ_{8}	1_{33} • 3_{31}
E^{8}	Uniform 8-honeycomb	0_{[9]}	δ_{9}	hδ_{9}	qδ_{9}	1_{52} • 2_{51} • 5_{21}
E^{9}	Uniform 9-honeycomb	0_{[10]}	δ_{10}	hδ_{10}	qδ_{10}	
E^{10}	Uniform 10-honeycomb	0_{[11]}	δ_{11}	hδ_{11}	qδ_{11}	
E^{n−1}	Uniform (n−1)-honeycomb	0_{[n]}	δ_{n}	hδ_{n}	qδ_{n}	1_{k2} • 2_{k1} • k_{21}
