= Hyperbolic tetrahedral-octahedral honeycomb =

Tetrahedron-octahedron honeycomb
Type	Compact uniform honeycomb Semiregular honeycomb
Schläfli symbol	{(3,4,3,3)} or {(3,3,4,3)}
Coxeter diagram	or or
Cells	{3,3} {3,4}
Faces	triangular {3}
Vertex figure	rhombicuboctahedron
Coxeter group	[(4,3,3,3)]
Properties	Vertex-transitive, edge-transitive

In the geometry of hyperbolic 3-space, the tetrahedron-octahedron honeycomb is a compact uniform honeycomb, constructed from octahedron and tetrahedron cells, in a rhombicuboctahedron vertex figure.

A geometric honeycomb is a space-filling of polyhedral or higher-dimensional cells, so that there are no gaps. It is an example of the more general mathematical tiling or tessellation in any number of dimensions.

Honeycombs are usually constructed in ordinary Euclidean ("flat") space, like the convex uniform honeycombs. They may also be constructed in non-Euclidean spaces, such as hyperbolic uniform honeycombs. Any finite uniform polytope can be projected to its circumsphere to form a uniform honeycomb in spherical space.

It represents a semiregular honeycomb as defined by all regular cells, although from the Wythoff construction, rectified tetrahedral r{3,3}, becomes the regular octahedron {3,4}.

== Images ==
Wide-angle perspective view
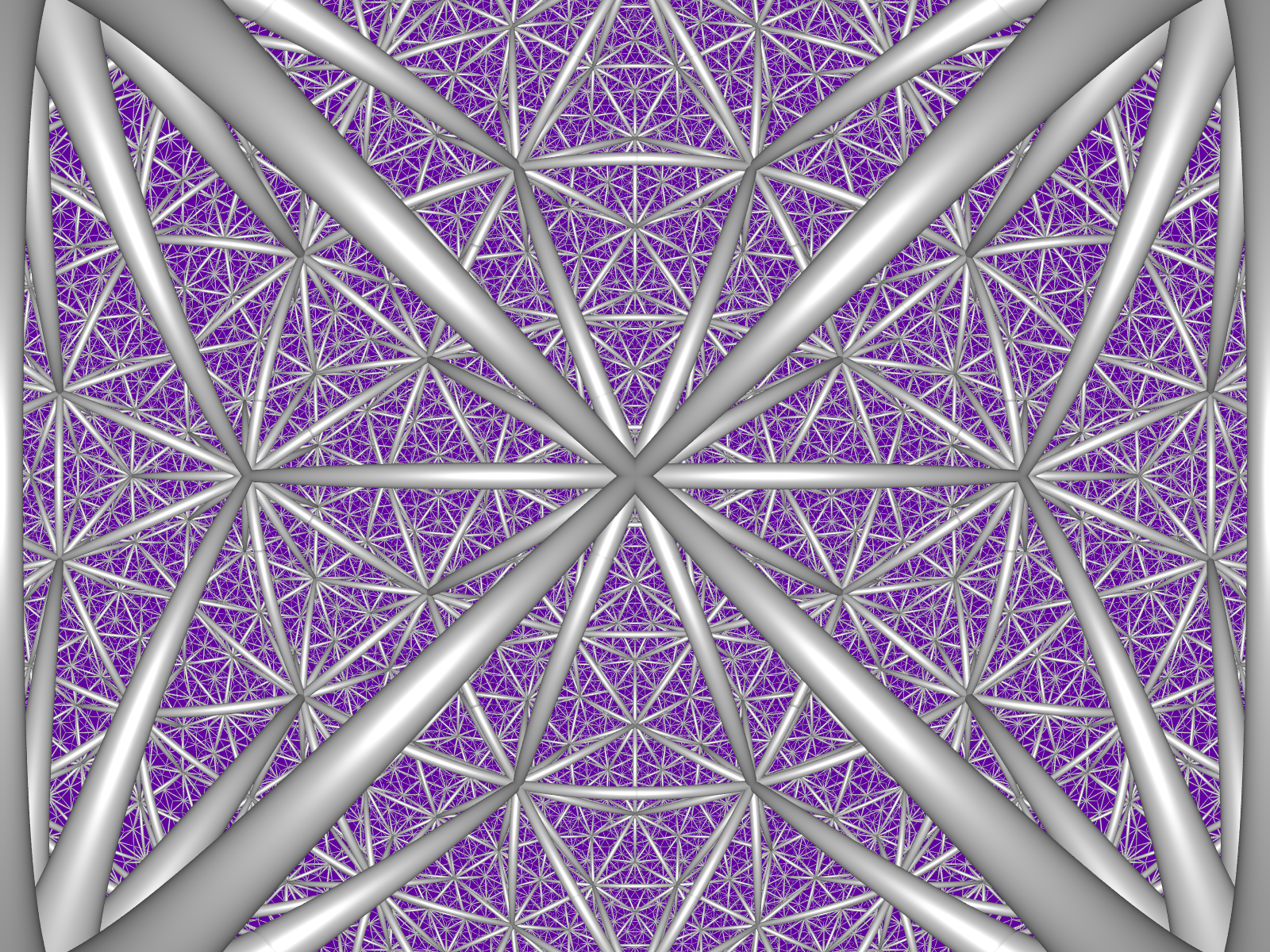
Centered on octahedron

== See also ==
- Convex uniform honeycombs in hyperbolic space
- List of regular polytopes
- Tetrahedral-octahedral honeycomb - similar Euclidean honeycomb,
- Tetrahedral-cubic honeycomb
