= Tetrahedral-cubic honeycomb =

Compact uniform honeycomb

Tetrahedron-cube honeycomb
Type	Compact uniform honeycomb
Schläfli symbol	{(4,3,3,3)} or {(3,3,3,4)}
Coxeter diagram	or or
Cells	{3,3} {4,3} r{4,3}
Faces	triangular {3} square {4}
Vertex figure	cuboctahedron
Coxeter group	[(4,3,3,3)]
Properties	Vertex-transitive, edge-transitive

In the geometry of hyperbolic 3-space, the tetrahedron-cube honeycomb is a compact uniform honeycomb, constructed from cube, tetrahedron, and cuboctahedron cells, in a rhombicuboctahedron vertex figure. It has a single-ring Coxeter diagram,, and is named by its two regular cells.

A geometric honeycomb is a space-filling of polyhedral or higher-dimensional cells, so that there are no gaps. It is an example of the more general mathematical tiling or tessellation in any number of dimensions.

Honeycombs are usually constructed in ordinary Euclidean ("flat") space, like the convex uniform honeycombs. They may also be constructed in non-Euclidean spaces, such as hyperbolic uniform honeycombs. Any finite uniform polytope can be projected to its circumsphere to form a uniform honeycomb in spherical space.

== Images ==
Wide-angle perspective view
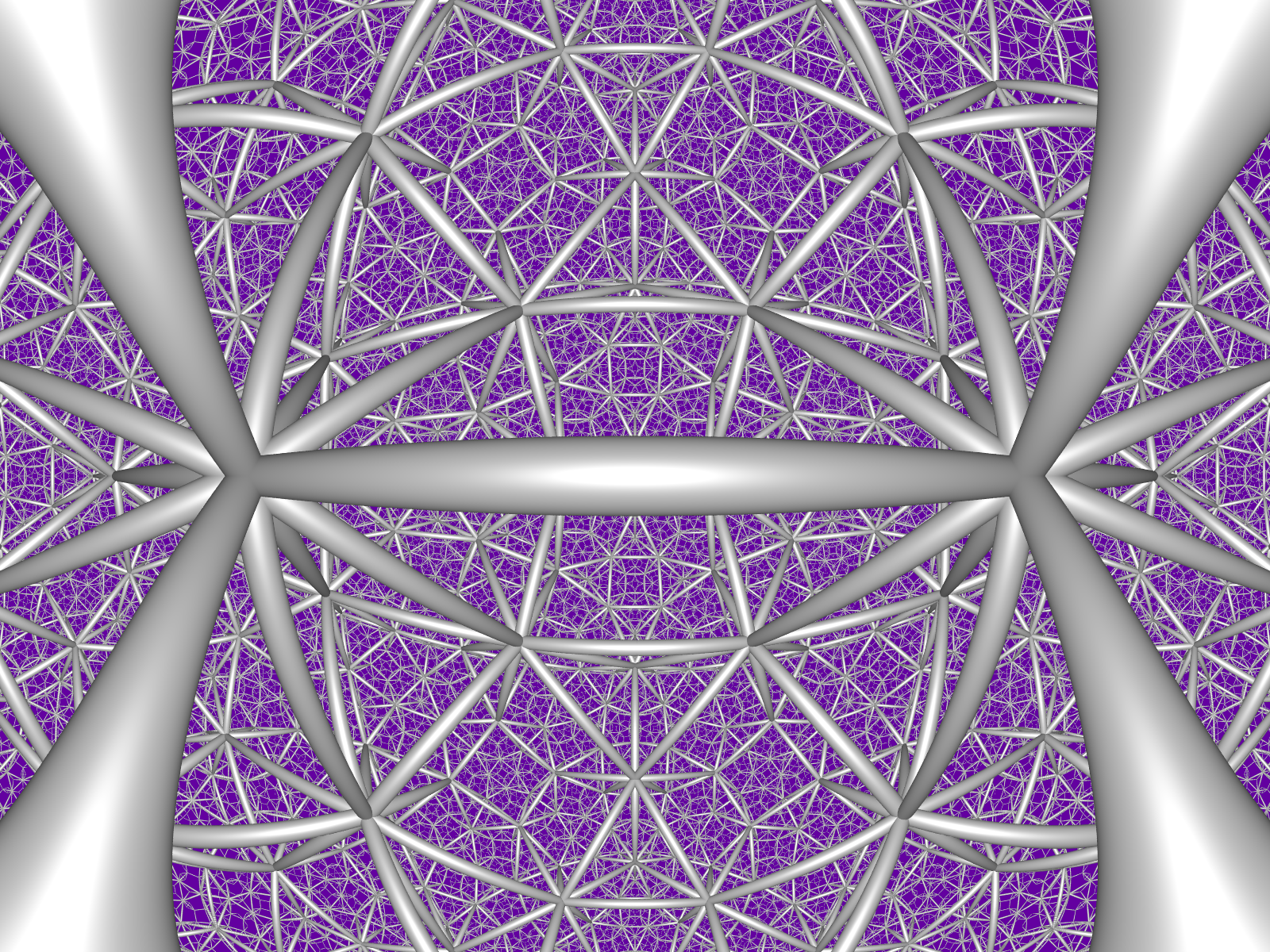
Centered on cube

== See also ==
- Convex uniform honeycombs in hyperbolic space
- List of regular polytopes
- Hyperbolic tetrahedral-octahedral honeycomb
