= Tetrahedral-icosahedral honeycomb =

Tetrahedral-icosahedral honeycomb
Type	Compact uniform honeycomb Semiregular honeycomb
Schläfli symbol	{(3,3,5,3)}
Coxeter diagram	or or
Cells	{3,3} {3,5} r{3,3}
Faces	triangle {3}
Vertex figure	rhombicosidodecahedron
Coxeter group	[(5,3,3,3)]
Properties	Vertex-transitive, edge-transitive

In the geometry of hyperbolic 3-space, the tetrahedral-icosahedral honeycomb is a compact uniform honeycomb, constructed from icosahedron, tetrahedron, and octahedron cells, in an icosidodecahedron vertex figure. It has a single-ring Coxeter diagram, and is named by its two regular cells.

A geometric honeycomb is a space-filling of polyhedral or higher-dimensional cells, so that there are no gaps. It is an example of the more general mathematical tiling or tessellation in any number of dimensions.

Honeycombs are usually constructed in ordinary Euclidean ("flat") space, like the convex uniform honeycombs. They may also be constructed in non-Euclidean spaces, such as hyperbolic uniform honeycombs. Any finite uniform polytope can be projected to its circumsphere to form a uniform honeycomb in spherical space.

It represents a semiregular honeycomb as defined by all regular cells, although from the Wythoff construction, the octahedron comes from the rectified tetrahedron.

== Images ==
Wide-angle perspective views
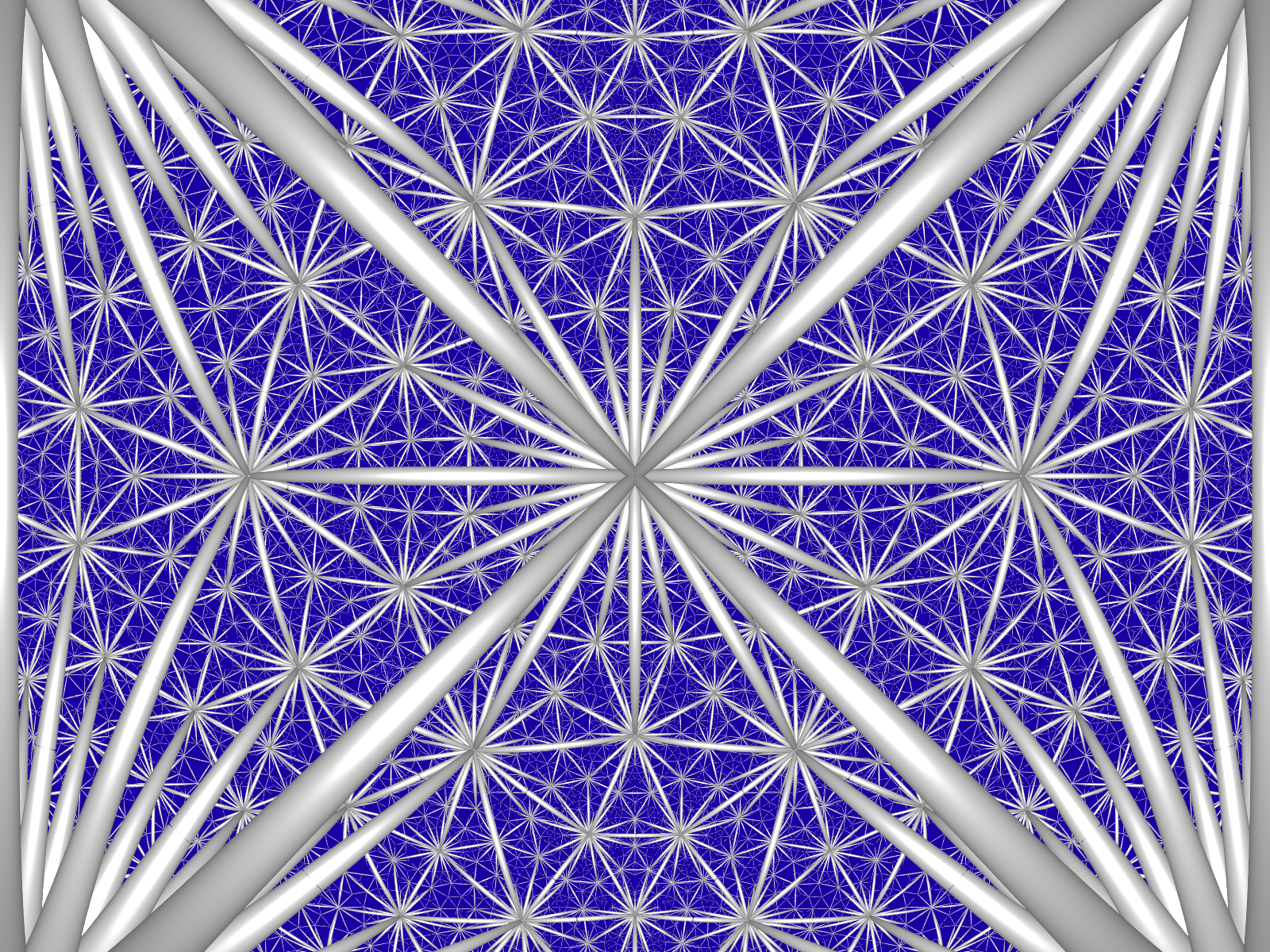
Centered on octahedron

== See also ==
- Convex uniform honeycombs in hyperbolic space
- List of regular polytopes
