= Alternated hexagonal tiling honeycomb =

Alternated hexagonal tiling honeycomb
Type	Paracompact uniform honeycomb Semiregular honeycomb
Schläfli symbols	h{6,3,3} s{3,6,3} 2s{6,3,6} 2s{6,3^{[3]}} s{3^{[3,3]}}
Coxeter diagrams	↔ ↔ ↔ ↔
Cells	{3,3} {3^{[3]}}
Faces	triangle {3}
Vertex figure	truncated tetrahedron
Coxeter groups	${\overline{P}}_3$, [3,3^{[3]}] 1/2 ${\overline{V}}_3$, [6,3,3] 1/2 ${\overline{Y}}_3$, [3,6,3] 1/2 ${\overline{Z}}_3$, [6,3,6] 1/2 ${\overline{VP}}_3$, [6,3^{[3]}] 1/2 ${\overline{PP}}_3$, [3^{[3,3]}]
Properties	Vertex-transitive, edge-transitive, quasiregular

In three-dimensional hyperbolic geometry, the alternated hexagonal tiling honeycomb, h{6,3,3}, or, is a semiregular tessellation with tetrahedron and triangular tiling cells arranged in an octahedron vertex figure. It is named after its construction, as an alternation of a hexagonal tiling honeycomb.

A geometric honeycomb is a space-filling of polyhedral or higher-dimensional cells, so that there are no gaps. It is an example of the more general mathematical tiling or tessellation in any number of dimensions.

Honeycombs are usually constructed in ordinary Euclidean ("flat") space, like the convex uniform honeycombs. They may also be constructed in non-Euclidean spaces, such as hyperbolic uniform honeycombs. Any finite uniform polytope can be projected to its circumsphere to form a uniform honeycomb in spherical space.

== Symmetry constructions ==
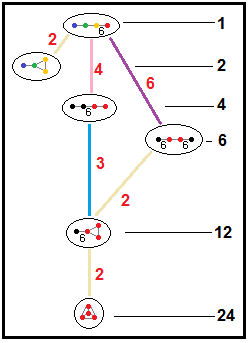
Subgroup relations

It has five alternated constructions from reflectional Coxeter groups all with four mirrors and only the first being regular: [6,3,3], [3,6,3], [6,3,6], [6,3^{[3]}] and [3^{[3,3]}], having 1, 4, 6, 12 and 24 times larger fundamental domains respectively. In Coxeter notation subgroup markups, they are related as: [6,(3,3)^{*}] (remove 3 mirrors, index 24 subgroup); [3,6,3^{*}] or [3^{*},6,3] (remove 2 mirrors, index 6 subgroup); [1^{+},6,3,6,1^{+}] (remove two orthogonal mirrors, index 4 subgroup); all of these are isomorphic to [3^{[3,3]}]. The ringed Coxeter diagrams are,,, and, representing different types (colors) of hexagonal tilings in the Wythoff construction.

== Related honeycombs ==
The alternated hexagonal tiling honeycomb has 3 related forms: the cantic hexagonal tiling honeycomb,; the runcic hexagonal tiling honeycomb,; and the runcicantic hexagonal tiling honeycomb,.

=== Cantic hexagonal tiling honeycomb ===
Cantic hexagonal tiling honeycomb
Type	Paracompact uniform honeycomb
Schläfli symbols	h_{2}{6,3,3}
Coxeter diagrams	↔
Cells	r{3,3} t{3,3} h_{2}{6,3}
Faces	triangle {3} hexagon {6}
Vertex figure	wedge
Coxeter groups	${\overline{P}}_3$, [3,3^{[3]}]
Properties	Vertex-transitive

The cantic hexagonal tiling honeycomb, h_{2}{6,3,3}, or, is composed of octahedron, truncated tetrahedron, and trihexagonal tiling facets, with a wedge vertex figure.

=== Runcic hexagonal tiling honeycomb ===
Runcic hexagonal tiling honeycomb
Type	Paracompact uniform honeycomb
Schläfli symbols	h_{3}{6,3,3}
Coxeter diagrams	↔
Cells	{3,3} {}x{3} rr{3,3} {3^{[3]}}
Faces	triangle {3} square {4} hexagon {6}
Vertex figure	triangular cupola
Coxeter groups	${\overline{P}}_3$, [3,3^{[3]}]
Properties	Vertex-transitive

The runcic hexagonal tiling honeycomb, h_{3}{6,3,3}, or, has tetrahedron, triangular prism, cuboctahedron, and triangular tiling facets, with a triangular cupola vertex figure.

=== Runcicantic hexagonal tiling honeycomb ===
Runcicantic hexagonal tiling honeycomb
Type	Paracompact uniform honeycomb
Schläfli symbols	h_{2,3}{6,3,3}
Coxeter diagrams	↔
Cells	t{3,3} {}x{3} tr{3,3} h_{2}{6,3}
Faces	triangle {3} square {4} hexagon {6}
Vertex figure	rectangular pyramid
Coxeter groups	${\overline{P}}_3$, [3,3^{[3]}]
Properties	Vertex-transitive

The runcicantic hexagonal tiling honeycomb, h_{2,3}{6,3,3}, or, has truncated tetrahedron, triangular prism, truncated octahedron, and trihexagonal tiling facets, with a rectangular pyramid vertex figure.

== See also ==
- Convex uniform honeycombs in hyperbolic space
- Regular tessellations of hyperbolic 3-space
- Paracompact uniform honeycombs
- Semiregular honeycomb
- Hexagonal tiling honeycomb
