= Octahedral-hexagonal tiling honeycomb =

Octahedron-hexagonal tiling honeycomb
Type	Paracompact uniform honeycomb
Schläfli symbol	{(3,4,3,6)} or {(6,3,4,3)}
Coxeter diagrams	or
Cells	{3,4} {6,3} r{6,3}
Faces	triangular {3} square {4} hexagon {6}
Vertex figure	rhombicuboctahedron
Coxeter group	[(6,3,4,3)]
Properties	Vertex-transitive, edge-transitive

In the geometry of hyperbolic 3-space, the octahedron-hexagonal tiling honeycomb is a paracompact uniform honeycomb, constructed from octahedron, hexagonal tiling, and trihexagonal tiling cells, in a rhombicuboctahedron vertex figure. It has a single-ring Coxeter diagram,, and is named by its two regular cells.

A geometric honeycomb is a space-filling of polyhedral or higher-dimensional cells, so that there are no gaps. It is an example of the more general mathematical tiling or tessellation in any number of dimensions.

Honeycombs are usually constructed in ordinary Euclidean ("flat") space, like the convex uniform honeycombs. They may also be constructed in non-Euclidean spaces, such as hyperbolic uniform honeycombs. Any finite uniform polytope can be projected to its circumsphere to form a uniform honeycomb in spherical space.

== Symmetry ==
A lower symmetry form, index 6, of this honeycomb can be constructed with [(6,3,4,3^{*})] symmetry, represented by a trigonal trapezohedron fundamental domain, and a Coxeter diagram .

== Related honeycombs ==
=== Cyclotruncated octahedral-hexagonal tiling honeycomb ===
Cyclotruncated octahedral-hexagonal tiling honeycomb
Type	Paracompact uniform honeycomb
Schläfli symbol	ct{(3,4,3,6)} or ct{(3,6,3,4)}
Coxeter diagrams	or
Cells	{6,3} {4,3} t{3,4}
Faces	triangular {3} square {4} hexagon {6}
Vertex figure	triangular antiprism
Coxeter group	[(6,3,4,3)]
Properties	Vertex-transitive

The cyclotruncated octahedral-hexagonal tiling honeycomb is a compact uniform honeycomb, constructed from hexagonal tiling, cube, and truncated octahedron cells, in a triangular antiprism vertex figure. It has a Coxeter diagram.

==== Symmetry ====
A radial subgroup symmetry, index 6, of this honeycomb can be constructed with [(4,3,6,3^{*})], represented by a trigonal trapezohedron fundamental domain, and Coxeter diagram .

== See also ==
- Convex uniform honeycombs in hyperbolic space
- List of regular polytopes
