= Cubic-square tiling honeycomb =

Cubic-square tiling honeycomb
Type	Paracompact uniform honeycomb Semiregular honeycomb
Schläfli symbol	{(4,4,3,4)}, {(4,3,4,4)}
Coxeter diagrams	or =
Cells	{4,3} {4,4} r{4,4}
Faces	square {4}
Vertex figure	Rhombicuboctahedron
Coxeter group	[(4,4,4,3)]
Properties	Vertex-transitive, edge-transitive

In the geometry of hyperbolic 3-space, the cubic-square tiling honeycomb is a paracompact uniform honeycomb, constructed from cube and square tiling cells, in a rhombicuboctahedron vertex figure. It has a single-ring Coxeter diagram,, and is named by its two regular cells.

A geometric honeycomb is a space-filling of polyhedral or higher-dimensional cells, so that there are no gaps. It is an example of the more general mathematical tiling or tessellation in any number of dimensions.

Honeycombs are usually constructed in ordinary Euclidean ("flat") space, like the convex uniform honeycombs. They may also be constructed in non-Euclidean spaces, such as hyperbolic uniform honeycombs. Any finite uniform polytope can be projected to its circumsphere to form a uniform honeycomb in spherical space.

It represents a semiregular honeycomb as defined by all regular cells, although from the Wythoff construction, rectified square tiling r{4,4}, becomes the regular square tiling {4,4}.

== Symmetry ==
A lower symmetry form, index 6, of this honeycomb can be constructed with [(4,4,4,3*] symmetry, represented by a trigonal trapezohedron fundamental domain, and Coxeter diagram. Another lower symmetry constructions exists with symmetry [(4,4,(4,3)*)], index 48 and an ideal regular octahedral fundamental domain.

== See also ==
- Convex uniform honeycombs in hyperbolic space
- List of regular polytopes
