= Cubic-triangular tiling honeycomb =

Cubic-triangular tiling honeycomb
Type	Paracompact uniform honeycomb
Schläfli symbol	{(3,6,3,4)} or {(4,3,6,3)}
Coxeter diagrams	or
Cells	{4,3} {3,6} r{4,3}
Faces	triangular {3} square {4} hexagon {6}
Vertex figure	rhombitrihexagonal tiling
Coxeter group	[(6,3,4,3)]
Properties	Vertex-transitive, edge-transitive

In the geometry of hyperbolic 3-space, the cubic-triangular tiling honeycomb is a paracompact uniform honeycomb, constructed from cube, triangular tiling, and cuboctahedron cells, in a rhombitrihexagonal tiling vertex figure. It has a single-ring Coxeter diagram,, and is named by its two regular cells.

A geometric honeycomb is a space-filling of polyhedral or higher-dimensional cells, so that there are no gaps. It is an example of the more general mathematical tiling or tessellation in any number of dimensions.

Honeycombs are usually constructed in ordinary Euclidean ("flat") space, like the convex uniform honeycombs. They may also be constructed in non-Euclidean spaces, such as hyperbolic uniform honeycombs. Any finite uniform polytope can be projected to its circumsphere to form a uniform honeycomb in spherical space.

== See also ==
- Convex uniform honeycombs in hyperbolic space
- List of regular polytopes
