= Tetrahedral-square tiling honeycomb =

Tetrahedral-square tiling honeycomb
Type	Paracompact uniform honeycomb
Schläfli symbol	{(4,4,3,3)} or {(3,3,4,4)}
Coxeter diagrams	
Cells	{3,3} {4,4} r{4,3}
Faces	triangle {3} square {4}
Vertex figure	Rhombicuboctahedron
Coxeter group	[(4,4,3,3)]
Properties	Vertex-transitive, edge-transitive

In the geometry of hyperbolic 3-space, the tetrahedral-square tiling honeycomb is a paracompact uniform honeycomb, constructed from tetrahedron, cuboctahedron and square tiling cells, in a rhombicuboctahedron vertex figure. It has a single-ring Coxeter diagram,, and is named by its two regular cells.

A geometric honeycomb is a space-filling of polyhedral or higher-dimensional cells, so that there are no gaps. It is an example of the more general mathematical tiling or tessellation in any number of dimensions.

Honeycombs are usually constructed in ordinary Euclidean ("flat") space, like the convex uniform honeycombs. They may also be constructed in non-Euclidean spaces, such as hyperbolic uniform honeycombs. Any finite uniform polytope can be projected to its circumsphere to form a uniform honeycomb in spherical space.

== Cyclotruncated tetrahedral-square tiling honeycomb ==
Cyclotruncated tetrahedral-square tiling honeycomb
Type	Paracompact uniform honeycomb
Schläfli symbol	t_{0,1}{(4,4,3,3)}
Coxeter diagrams	
Cells	{4,3} t{4,3} {3,3} t{4,3}
Faces	triangle {3} square {4} octagon {8}
Vertex figure	Triangular antiprism
Coxeter group	[(4,4,3,3)]
Properties	Vertex-transitive

The cyclotruncated tetrahedral-square tiling honeycomb is a paracompact uniform honeycomb, constructed from tetrahedron, cube, truncated cube and truncated square tiling cells, in a triangular antiprism vertex figure. It has a Coxeter diagram,.

== See also ==
- Convex uniform honeycombs in hyperbolic space
- List of regular polytopes
