= Paracompact uniform honeycombs =

Tessellation of convex uniform polyhedron cells

Example paracompact regular honeycombs
{3,3,6}	{6,3,3}	{4,3,6}	{6,3,4}
{5,3,6}	{6,3,5}	{6,3,6}	{3,6,3}
{4,4,3}	{3,4,4}	{4,4,4}	

In geometry, uniform honeycombs in hyperbolic space are tessellations of convex uniform polyhedron cells. In 3-dimensional hyperbolic space there are 23 Coxeter group families of paracompact uniform honeycombs, generated as Wythoff constructions, and represented by ring permutations of the Coxeter diagrams for each family. These families can produce uniform honeycombs with infinite or unbounded facets or vertex figure, including ideal vertices at infinity, similar to the hyperbolic uniform tilings in two dimensions.

== Regular paracompact honeycombs ==
Of the uniform paracompact H^{3} honeycombs, 11 are regular, meaning that their group of symmetries acts transitively on their flags. These have Schläfli symbol {3,3,6}, {6,3,3}, {3,4,4}, {4,4,3}, {3,6,3}, {4,3,6}, {6,3,4}, {4,4,4}, {5,3,6}, {6,3,5}, and {6,3,6}, and are shown below. Four have finite Ideal polyhedral cells: {3,3,6}, {4,3,6}, {3,4,4}, and {5,3,6}.

11 paracompact regular honeycombs
{6,3,3}	{6,3,4}	{6,3,5}	{6,3,6}	{4,4,3}	{4,4,4}
{3,3,6}	{4,3,6}	{5,3,6}	{3,6,3}	{3,4,4}	

Name	Schläfli Symbol {p,q,r}	Coxeter	Cell type {p,q}	Face type {p}	Edge figure {r}	Vertex figure {q,r}	Dual	Coxeter group
Order-6 tetrahedral honeycomb	{3,3,6}		{3,3}	{3}	{6}	{3,6}	{6,3,3}	[6,3,3]
Hexagonal tiling honeycomb	{6,3,3}		{6,3}	{6}	{3}	{3,3}	{3,3,6}	[6,3,3]
Order-4 octahedral honeycomb	{3,4,4}		{3,4}	{3}	{4}	{4,4}	{4,4,3}	[4,4,3]
Square tiling honeycomb	{4,4,3}		{4,4}	{4}	{3}	{4,3}	{3,4,4}	[4,4,3]
Triangular tiling honeycomb	{3,6,3}		{3,6}	{3}	{3}	{6,3}	Self-dual	[3,6,3]
Order-6 cubic honeycomb	{4,3,6}		{4,3}	{4}	{4}	{3,6}	{6,3,4}	[6,3,4]
Order-4 hexagonal tiling honeycomb	{6,3,4}		{6,3}	{6}	{4}	{3,4}	{4,3,6}	[6,3,4]
Order-4 square tiling honeycomb	{4,4,4}		{4,4}	{4}	{4}	{4,4}	Self-dual	[4,4,4]
Order-6 dodecahedral honeycomb	{5,3,6}		{5,3}	{5}	{5}	{3,6}	{6,3,5}	[6,3,5]
Order-5 hexagonal tiling honeycomb	{6,3,5}		{6,3}	{6}	{5}	{3,5}	{5,3,6}	[6,3,5]
Order-6 hexagonal tiling honeycomb	{6,3,6}		{6,3}	{6}	{6}	{3,6}	Self-dual	[6,3,6]

== Coxeter groups of paracompact uniform honeycombs ==
These graphs show subgroup relations of paracompact hyperbolic Coxeter groups. Order 2 subgroups represent bisecting a Goursat tetrahedron with a plane of mirror symmetry.

This is a complete enumeration of the 151 unique Wythoffian paracompact uniform honeycombs generated from tetrahedral fundamental domains (rank 4 paracompact coxeter groups). The honeycombs are indexed here for cross-referencing duplicate forms, with brackets around the nonprimary constructions.

The alternations are listed, but are either repeats or don't generate uniform solutions. Single-hole alternations represent a mirror removal operation. If an end-node is removed, another simplex (tetrahedral) family is generated. If a hole has two branches, a Vinberg polytope is generated, although only Vinberg polytope with mirror symmetry are related to the simplex groups, and their uniform honeycombs have not been systematically explored. These nonsimplectic (pyramidal) Coxeter groups are not enumerated on this page, except as special cases of half groups of the tetrahedral ones. Seven uniform honeycombs that arise here as alternations have been numbered 152 to 158, after the 151 Wythoffian forms not requiring alternation for their construction.

Tetrahedral hyperbolic paracompact group summary
Coxeter group	Simplex volume	Commutator subgroup	Unique honeycomb count
[6,3,3]	0.0422892336	[1^{+},6,(3,3)^{+}] = [3,3^{[3]}]^{+}	15
[4,4,3]	0.0763304662	[1^{+},4,1^{+},4,3^{+}]	15
[3,3^{[3]}]	0.0845784672	[3,3^{[3]}]^{+}	4
[6,3,4]	0.1057230840	[1^{+},6,3^{+},4,1^{+}] = [3^{[]x[]}]^{+}	15
[3,4^{1,1}]	0.1526609324	[3^{+},4^{1^{+},1^{+}}]	4
[3,6,3]	0.1691569344	[3^{+},6,3^{+}]	8
[6,3,5]	0.1715016613	[1^{+},6,(3,5)^{+}] = [5,3^{[3]}]^{+}	15
[6,3^{1,1}]	0.2114461680	[1^{+},6,(3^{1,1})^{+}] = [3^{[]x[]}]^{+}	4
[4,3^{[3]}]	0.2114461680	[1^{+},4,3^{[3]}]^{+} = [3^{[]x[]}]^{+}	4
[4,4,4]	0.2289913985	[4^{+},4^{+},4^{+}]^{+}	6
[6,3,6]	0.2537354016	[1^{+},6,3^{+},6,1^{+}] = [3^{[3,3]}]^{+}	8
[(4,4,3,3)]	0.3053218647	[(4,1^{+},4,(3,3)^{+})]	4
[5,3^{[3]}]	0.3430033226	[5,3^{[3]}]^{+}	4
[(6,3,3,3)]	0.3641071004	[(6,3,3,3)]^{+}	9
[3^{[]x[]}]	0.4228923360	[3^{[]x[]}]^{+}	1
[4^{1,1,1}]	0.4579827971	[1^{+},4^{1^{+},1^{+},1^{+}}]	0
[6,3^{[3]}]	0.5074708032	[1^{+},6,3^{[3]}] = [3^{[3,3]}]^{+}	2
[(6,3,4,3)]	0.5258402692	[(6,3^{+},4,3^{+})]	9
[(4,4,4,3)]	0.5562821156	[(4,1^{+},4,1^{+},4,3^{+})]	9
[(6,3,5,3)]	0.6729858045	[(6,3,5,3)]^{+}	9
[(6,3,6,3)]	0.8457846720	[(6,3^{+},6,3^{+})]	5
[(4,4,4,4)]	0.9159655942	[(4^{+},4^{+},4^{+},4^{+})]	1
[3^{[3,3]}]	1.014916064	[3^{[3,3]}]^{+}	0

The complete list of nonsimplectic (non-tetrahedral) paracompact Coxeter groups was published by P. Tumarkin in 2003. The smallest paracompact form in H^{3} can be represented by or, or [∞,3,3,∞] which can be constructed by a mirror removal of paracompact hyperbolic group [3,4,4] as [3,4,1^{+},4] : =. The doubled fundamental domain changes from a tetrahedron into a quadrilateral pyramid. Another pyramid is or, constructed as [4,4,1^{+},4] = [∞,4,4,∞] : =.

Removing a mirror from some of the cyclic hyperbolic Coxeter graphs become bow-tie graphs: [(3,3,4,1^{+},4)] = [((3,∞,3)),((3,∞,3))] or, [(3,4,4,1^{+},4)] = [((4,∞,3)),((3,∞,4))] or, [(4,4,4,1^{+},4)] = [((4,∞,4)),((4,∞,4))] or. =, =, =.

Another nonsimplectic half groups is ↔.

A radical nonsimplectic subgroup is ↔, which can be doubled into a triangular prism domain as ↔.

Pyramidal hyperbolic paracompact group summary
Dimension	Rank	Graphs
H^{3}	5	| | | | | | | | | | | | | | | | | | | | | | | | | | |

== Linear graphs ==
=== [6,3,3] family ===
#	Honeycomb name Coxeter diagram: Schläfli symbol	Cells by location (and count around each vertex)				Vertex figure	Picture
#	Honeycomb name Coxeter diagram: Schläfli symbol	1	2	3	4	Vertex figure	Picture
1	hexagonal (hexah) {6,3,3}	-	-	-	(4) (6.6.6)	Tetrahedron	
2	rectified hexagonal (rihexah) t_{1}{6,3,3} or r{6,3,3}	(2) (3.3.3)	-	-	(3) (3.6.3.6)	Triangular prism	
3	rectified order-6 tetrahedral (rath) t_{1}{3,3,6} or r{3,3,6}	(6) (3.3.3.3)	-	-	(2) (3.3.3.3.3.3)	Hexagonal prism	
4	order-6 tetrahedral (thon) {3,3,6}	(∞) (3.3.3)	-	-	-	Triangular tiling	
5	truncated hexagonal (thexah) t_{0,1}{6,3,3} or t{6,3,3}	(1) (3.3.3)	-	-	(3) (3.12.12)	Triangular pyramid	
6	cantellated hexagonal (srihexah) t_{0,2}{6,3,3} or rr{6,3,3}	(1) 3.3.3.3	(2) (4.4.3)	-	(2) (3.4.6.4)		
7	runcinated hexagonal (sidpithexah) t_{0,3}{6,3,3}	(1) (3.3.3)	(3) (4.4.3)	(3) (4.4.6)	(1) (6.6.6)		
8	cantellated order-6 tetrahedral (srath) t_{0,2}{3,3,6} or rr{3,3,6}	(1) (3.4.3.4)	-	(2) (4.4.6)	(2) (3.6.3.6)		
9	bitruncated hexagonal (tehexah) t_{1,2}{6,3,3} or 2t{6,3,3}	(2) (3.6.6)	-	-	(2) (6.6.6)		
10	truncated order-6 tetrahedral (tath) t_{0,1}{3,3,6} or t{3,3,6}	(6) (3.6.6)	-	-	(1) (3.3.3.3.3.3)		
11	cantitruncated hexagonal (grihexah) t_{0,1,2}{6,3,3} or tr{6,3,3}	(1) (3.6.6)	(1) (4.4.3)	-	(2) (4.6.12)		
12	runcitruncated hexagonal (prath) t_{0,1,3}{6,3,3}	(1) (3.4.3.4)	(2) (4.4.3)	(1) (4.4.12)	(1) (3.12.12)		
13	runcitruncated order-6 tetrahedral (prihexah) t_{0,1,3}{3,3,6}	(1) (3.6.6)	(1) (4.4.6)	(2) (4.4.6)	(1) (3.4.6.4)		
14	cantitruncated order-6 tetrahedral (grath) t_{0,1,2}{3,3,6} or tr{3,3,6}	(2) (4.6.6)	-	(1) (4.4.6)	(1) (6.6.6)		
15	omnitruncated hexagonal (gidpithexah) t_{0,1,2,3}{6,3,3}	(1) (4.6.6)	(1) (4.4.6)	(1) (4.4.12)	(1) (4.6.12)		

Alternated forms
#	Honeycomb name Coxeter diagram: Schläfli symbol	Cells by location (and count around each vertex)					Vertex figure	Picture
#	Honeycomb name Coxeter diagram: Schläfli symbol	1	2	3	4	Alt	Vertex figure	Picture
[137]	alternated hexagonal (ahexah) ( ↔) =	-	-		(4) (3.3.3.3.3.3)	(4) (3.3.3)	(3.6.6)	
[138]	cantic hexagonal (tahexah) ↔	(1) (3.3.3.3)	-		(2) (3.6.3.6)	(2) (3.6.6)		
[139]	runcic hexagonal (birahexah) ↔	(1) (4.4.4)	(1) (4.4.3)		(1) (3.3.3.3.3.3)	(3) (3.4.3.4)		
[140]	runcicantic hexagonal (bitahexah) ↔	(1) (3.6.6)	(1) (4.4.3)		(1) (3.6.3.6)	(2) (4.6.6)		
Nonuniform	snub rectified order-6 tetrahedral ↔ sr{3,3,6}					Irr. (3.3.3)		
Nonuniform	cantic snub order-6 tetrahedral sr_{3}{3,3,6}							
Nonuniform	omnisnub order-6 tetrahedral ht_{0,1,2,3}{6,3,3}					Irr. (3.3.3)		

=== [6,3,4] family ===
There are 15 forms, generated by ring permutations of the Coxeter group: [6,3,4] or

#	Name of honeycomb Coxeter diagram Schläfli symbol	Cells by location and count per vertex				Vertex figure	Picture
#	Name of honeycomb Coxeter diagram Schläfli symbol	0	1	2	3	Vertex figure	Picture
16	(Regular) order-4 hexagonal (shexah) {6,3,4}	-	-	-	(8) (6.6.6)	(3.3.3.3)	
17	rectified order-4 hexagonal (rishexah) t_{1}{6,3,4} or r{6,3,4}	(2) (3.3.3.3)	-	-	(4) (3.6.3.6)	(4.4.4)	
18	rectified order-6 cubic (rihach) t_{1}{4,3,6} or r{4,3,6}	(6) (3.4.3.4)	-	-	(2) (3.3.3.3.3.3)	(6.4.4)	
19	order-6 cubic (hachon) {4,3,6}	(20) (4.4.4)	-	-	-	(3.3.3.3.3.3)	
20	truncated order-4 hexagonal (tishexah) t_{0,1}{6,3,4} or t{6,3,4}	(1) (3.3.3.3)	-	-	(4) (3.12.12)		
21	bitruncated order-6 cubic (chexah) t_{1,2}{6,3,4} or 2t{6,3,4}	(2) (4.6.6)	-	-	(2) (6.6.6)		
22	truncated order-6 cubic (thach) t_{0,1}{4,3,6} or t{4,3,6}	(6) (3.8.8)	-	-	(1) (3.3.3.3.3.3)		
23	cantellated order-4 hexagonal (srishexah) t_{0,2}{6,3,4} or rr{6,3,4}	(1) (3.4.3.4)	(2) (4.4.4)	-	(2) (3.4.6.4)		
24	cantellated order-6 cubic (srihach) t_{0,2}{4,3,6} or rr{4,3,6}	(2) (3.4.4.4)	-	(2) (4.4.6)	(1) (3.6.3.6)		
25	runcinated order-6 cubic (sidpichexah) t_{0,3}{6,3,4}	(1) (4.4.4)	(3) (4.4.4)	(3) (4.4.6)	(1) (6.6.6)		
26	cantitruncated order-4 hexagonal (grishexah) t_{0,1,2}{6,3,4} or tr{6,3,4}	(1) (4.6.6)	(1) (4.4.4)	-	(2) (4.6.12)		
27	cantitruncated order-6 cubic (grihach) t_{0,1,2}{4,3,6} or tr{4,3,6}	(2) (4.6.8)	-	(1) (4.4.6)	(1) (6.6.6)		
28	runcitruncated order-4 hexagonal (prihach) t_{0,1,3}{6,3,4}	(1) (3.4.4.4)	(1) (4.4.4)	(2) (4.4.12)	(1) (3.12.12)		
29	runcitruncated order-6 cubic (prishexah) t_{0,1,3}{4,3,6}	(1) (3.8.8)	(2) (4.4.8)	(1) (4.4.6)	(1) (3.4.6.4)		
30	omnitruncated order-6 cubic (gidpichexah) t_{0,1,2,3}{6,3,4}	(1) (4.6.8)	(1) (4.4.8)	(1) (4.4.12)	(1) (4.6.12)		

Alternated forms
#	Name of honeycomb Coxeter diagram Schläfli symbol	Cells by location and count per vertex					Vertex figure	Picture
#	Name of honeycomb Coxeter diagram Schläfli symbol	0	1	2	3	Alt	Vertex figure	Picture
[87]	alternated order-6 cubic (ahach) ↔ h{4,3,6}	(3.3.3)				(3.3.3.3.3.3)	(3.6.3.6)	
[88]	cantic order-6 cubic (tachach) ↔ h_{2}{4,3,6}	(2) (3.6.6)	-	-	(1) (3.6.3.6)	(2) (6.6.6)		
[89]	runcic order-6 cubic (birachach) ↔ h_{3}{4,3,6}	(1) (3.3.3)	-	-	(1) (6.6.6)	(3) (3.4.6.4)		
[90]	runcicantic order-6 cubic (bitachach) ↔ h_{2,3}{4,3,6}	(1) (3.6.6)	-	-	(1) (3.12.12)	(2) (4.6.12)		
[141]	alternated order-4 hexagonal (ashexah) ↔ ↔ h{6,3,4}	-	-		(3.3.3.3.3.3)	(3.3.3.3)	(4.6.6)	
[142]	cantic order-4 hexagonal (tashexah) ↔ ↔ h_{1}{6,3,4}	(1) (3.4.3.4)	-		(2) (3.6.3.6)	(2) (4.6.6)		
[143]	runcic order-4 hexagonal (birashexah) ↔ h_{3}{6,3,4}	(1) (4.4.4)	(1) (4.4.3)		(1) (3.3.3.3.3.3)	(3) (3.4.4.4)		
[144]	runcicantic order-4 hexagonal (bitashexah) ↔ h_{2,3}{6,3,4}	(1) (3.8.8)	(1) (4.4.3)		(1) (3.6.3.6)	(2) (4.6.8)		
[151]	quarter order-4 hexagonal (quishexah) ↔ q{6,3,4}	(3)	(1)	-	(1)	(3)		
Nonuniform	bisnub order-6 cubic ↔ 2s{4,3,6}	(3.3.3.3.3)	-	-	(3.3.3.3.3.3)	+(3.3.3)		
Nonuniform	runcic bisnub order-6 cubic							
Nonuniform	snub rectified order-6 cubic ↔ sr{4,3,6}	(3.3.3.3.3)	(3.3.3)	(3.3.3.3)	(3.3.3.3.6)	+(3.3.3)		
Nonuniform	runcic snub rectified order-6 cubic sr_{3}{4,3,6}							
Nonuniform	snub rectified order-4 hexagonal ↔ sr{6,3,4}	(3.3.3.3.3.3)	(3.3.3)	-	(3.3.3.3.6)	+(3.3.3)		
Nonuniform	runcisnub rectified order-4 hexagonal sr_{3}{6,3,4}							
Nonuniform	omnisnub rectified order-6 cubic ht_{0,1,2,3}{6,3,4}	(3.3.3.3.4)	(3.3.3.4)	(3.3.3.6)	(3.3.3.3.6)	+(3.3.3)		

=== [6,3,5] family ===
#	Honeycomb name Coxeter diagram Schläfli symbol	Cells by location (and count around each vertex)				Vertex figure	Picture
#	Honeycomb name Coxeter diagram Schläfli symbol	0	1	2	3	Vertex figure	Picture
31	order-5 hexagonal (phexah) {6,3,5}	-	-	-	(20) (6)^{3}	Icosahedron	
32	rectified order-5 hexagonal (riphexah) t_{1}{6,3,5} or r{6,3,5}	(2) (3.3.3.3.3)	-	-	(5) (3.6)^{2}	(5.4.4)	
33	rectified order-6 dodecahedral (rihed) t_{1}{5,3,6} or r{5,3,6}	(5) (3.5.3.5)	-	-	(2) (3)^{6}	(6.4.4)	
34	order-6 dodecahedral (hedhon) {5,3,6}	(5.5.5)	-	-	-	(∞) (3)^{6}	
35	truncated order-5 hexagonal (tiphexah) t_{0,1}{6,3,5} or t{6,3,5}	(1) (3.3.3.3.3)	-	-	(5) 3.12.12		
36	cantellated order-5 hexagonal (sriphexah) t_{0,2}{6,3,5} or rr{6,3,5}	(1) (3.5.3.5)	(2) (5.4.4)	-	(2) 3.4.6.4		
37	runcinated order-6 dodecahedral (sidpidohexah) t_{0,3}{6,3,5}	(1) (5.5.5)	-	(6) (6.4.4)	(1) (6)^{3}		
38	cantellated order-6 dodecahedral (srihed) t_{0,2}{5,3,6} or rr{5,3,6}	(2) (4.3.4.5)	-	(2) (6.4.4)	(1) (3.6)^{2}		
39	bitruncated order-6 dodecahedral (dohexah) t_{1,2}{6,3,5} or 2t{6,3,5}	(2) (5.6.6)	-	-	(2) (6)^{3}		
40	truncated order-6 dodecahedral (thed) t_{0,1}{5,3,6} or t{5,3,6}	(6) (3.10.10)	-	-	(1) (3)^{6}		
41	cantitruncated order-5 hexagonal (griphexah) t_{0,1,2}{6,3,5} or tr{6,3,5}	(1) (5.6.6)	(1) (5.4.4)	-	(2) 4.6.10		
42	runcitruncated order-5 hexagonal (prihed) t_{0,1,3}{6,3,5}	(1) (4.3.4.5)	(1) (5.4.4)	(2) (12.4.4)	(1) 3.12.12		
43	runcitruncated order-6 dodecahedral (priphaxh) t_{0,1,3}{5,3,6}	(1) (3.10.10)	(1) (10.4.4)	(2) (6.4.4)	(1) 3.4.6.4		
44	cantitruncated order-6 dodecahedral (grihed) t_{0,1,2}{5,3,6} or tr{5,3,6}	(1) (4.6.10)	-	(2) (6.4.4)	(1) (6)^{3}		
45	omnitruncated order-6 dodecahedral (gidpidohaxh) t_{0,1,2,3}{6,3,5}	(1) (4.6.10)	(1) (10.4.4)	(1) (12.4.4)	(1) 4.6.12		

Alternated forms
#	Honeycomb name Coxeter diagram Schläfli symbol	Cells by location (and count around each vertex)					Vertex figure	Picture
#	Honeycomb name Coxeter diagram Schläfli symbol	0	1	2	3	Alt	Vertex figure	Picture
[145]	alternated order-5 hexagonal (aphexah) ↔ h{6,3,5}	-	-	-	(20) (3)^{6}	(12) (3)^{5}	(5.6.6)	
[146]	cantic order-5 hexagonal (taphexah) ↔ h_{2}{6,3,5}	(1) (3.5.3.5)	-		(2) (3.6.3.6)	(2) (5.6.6)		
[147]	runcic order-5 hexagonal (biraphexah) ↔ h_{3}{6,3,5}	(1) (5.5.5)	(1) (4.4.3)		(1) (3.3.3.3.3.3)	(3) (3.4.5.4)		
[148]	runcicantic order-5 hexagonal (bitaphexah) ↔ h_{2,3}{6,3,5}	(1) (3.10.10)	(1) (4.4.3)		(1) (3.6.3.6)	(2) (4.6.10)		
Nonuniform	snub rectified order-6 dodecahedral ↔ sr{5,3,6}	(3.3.5.3.5)	-	(3.3.3.3)	(3.3.3.3.3.3)	irr. tet		
Nonuniform	omnisnub order-5 hexagonal ht_{0,1,2,3}{6,3,5}	(3.3.5.3.5)	(3.3.3.5)	(3.3.3.6)	(3.3.6.3.6)	irr. tet		

=== [6,3,6] family ===
There are 9 forms, generated by ring permutations of the Coxeter group: [6,3,6] or

#	Name of honeycomb Coxeter diagram Schläfli symbol	Cells by location and count per vertex				Vertex figure	Picture
#	Name of honeycomb Coxeter diagram Schläfli symbol	0	1	2	3	Vertex figure	Picture
46	order-6 hexagonal (hihexah) {6,3,6}	-	-	-	(20) (6.6.6)	(3.3.3.3.3.3)	
47	rectified order-6 hexagonal (rihihexah) t_{1}{6,3,6} or r{6,3,6}	(2) (3.3.3.3.3.3)	-	-	(6) (3.6.3.6)	(6.4.4)	
48	truncated order-6 hexagonal (thihexah) t_{0,1}{6,3,6} or t{6,3,6}	(1) (3.3.3.3.3.3)	-	-	(6) (3.12.12)		
49	cantellated order-6 hexagonal (srihihexah) t_{0,2}{6,3,6} or rr{6,3,6}	(1) (3.6.3.6)	(2) (4.4.6)	-	(2) (3.6.4.6)		
50	Runcinated order-6 hexagonal (spiddihexah) t_{0,3}{6,3,6}	(1) (6.6.6)	(3) (4.4.6)	(3) (4.4.6)	(1) (6.6.6)		
51	cantitruncated order-6 hexagonal (grihihexah) t_{0,1,2}{6,3,6} or tr{6,3,6}	(1) (6.6.6)	(1) (4.4.6)	-	(2) (4.6.12)		
52	runcitruncated order-6 hexagonal (prihihexah) t_{0,1,3}{6,3,6}	(1) (3.6.4.6)	(1) (4.4.6)	(2) (4.4.12)	(1) (3.12.12)		
53	omnitruncated order-6 hexagonal (gidpiddihexah) t_{0,1,2,3}{6,3,6}	(1) (4.6.12)	(1) (4.4.12)	(1) (4.4.12)	(1) (4.6.12)		
[1]	bitruncated order-6 hexagonal (hexah) ↔ ↔ t_{1,2}{6,3,6} or 2t{6,3,6}	(2) (6.6.6)	-	-	(2) (6.6.6)		

Alternated forms
#	Name of honeycomb Coxeter diagram Schläfli symbol	Cells by location and count per vertex					Vertex figure	Picture
#	Name of honeycomb Coxeter diagram Schläfli symbol	0	1	2	3	Alt	Vertex figure	Picture
[47]	rectified order-6 hexagonal (rihihexah) ↔ ↔ q{6,3,6} = r{6,3,6}	(2) (3.3.3.3.3.3)	-	-	(6) (3.6.3.6)		(6.4.4)	
[54]	triangular (trah) ( ↔) = h{6,3,6} = {3,6,3}	-	-	-	(3.3.3.3.3.3)	(3.3.3.3.3.3)	{6,3}	
[55]	cantic order-6 hexagonal (ritrah) ( ↔) = h_{2}{6,3,6} = r{3,6,3}	(1) (3.6.3.6)	-	(2) (6.6.6)	(2) (3.6.3.6)			
[149]	runcic order-6 hexagonal (sirhahihexah) ↔ h_{3}{6,3,6}	(1) (6.6.6)	(1) (4.4.3)	(3) (3.4.6.4)	(1) (3.3.3.3.3.3)			
[150]	runcicantic order-6 hexagonal (girhahihexah) ↔ h_{2,3}{6,3,6}	(1) (3.12.12)	(1) (4.4.3)	(2) (4.6.12)	(1) (3.6.3.6)			
[137]	alternated hexagonal (ahexah) ( ↔ ↔) = 2s{6,3,6} = h{6,3,3}	(3.3.3.3.6)	-	-	(3.3.3.3.6)	+(3.3.3)	(3.6.6)	
Nonuniform	snub rectified order-6 hexagonal sr{6,3,6}	(3.3.3.3.3.3)	(3.3.3.3)	-	(3.3.3.3.6)	+(3.3.3)		
Nonuniform	alternated runcinated order-6 hexagonal ht_{0,3}{6,3,6}	(3.3.3.3.3.3)	(3.3.3.3)	(3.3.3.3)	(3.3.3.3.3.3)	+(3.3.3)		
Nonuniform	omnisnub order-6 hexagonal ht_{0,1,2,3}{6,3,6}	(3.3.3.3.6)	(3.3.3.6)	(3.3.3.6)	(3.3.3.3.6)	+(3.3.3)		

=== [3,6,3] family ===
There are 9 forms, generated by ring permutations of the Coxeter group: [3,6,3] or

#	Honeycomb name Coxeter diagram and Schläfli symbol	Cell counts/vertex and positions in honeycomb				Vertex figure	Picture
#	Honeycomb name Coxeter diagram and Schläfli symbol	0	1	2	3	Vertex figure	Picture
54	triangular (trah) {3,6,3}	-	-	-	(∞) {3,6}	{6,3}	
55	rectified triangular (ritrah) t_{1}{3,6,3} or r{3,6,3}	(2) (6)^{3}	-	-	(3) (3.6)^{2}	(3.4.4)	
56	cantellated triangular (sritrah) t_{0,2}{3,6,3} or rr{3,6,3}	(1) (3.6)^{2}	(2) (4.4.3)	-	(2) (3.6.4.6)		
57	runcinated triangular (spidditrah) t_{0,3}{3,6,3}	(1) (3)^{6}	(6) (4.4.3)	(6) (4.4.3)	(1) (3)^{6}		
58	bitruncated triangular (ditrah) t_{1,2}{3,6,3} or 2t{3,6,3}	(2) (3.12.12)	-	-	(2) (3.12.12)		
59	cantitruncated triangular (gritrah) t_{0,1,2}{3,6,3} or tr{3,6,3}	(1) (3.12.12)	(1) (4.4.3)	-	(2) (4.6.12)		
60	runcitruncated triangular (pritrah) t_{0,1,3}{3,6,3}	(1) (3.6.4.6)	(1) (4.4.3)	(2) (4.4.6)	(1) (6)^{3}		
61	omnitruncated triangular (gipidditrah) t_{0,1,2,3}{3,6,3}	(1) (4.6.12)	(1) (4.4.6)	(1) (4.4.6)	(1) (4.6.12)		
[1]	truncated triangular (hexah) ↔ ↔ t_{0,1}{3,6,3} or t{3,6,3} = {6,3,3}	(1) (6)^{3}	-	-	(3) (6)^{3}	{3,3}	

Alternated forms
#	Honeycomb name Coxeter diagram and Schläfli symbol	Cell counts/vertex and positions in honeycomb					Vertex figure	Picture
#	Honeycomb name Coxeter diagram and Schläfli symbol	0	1	2	3	Alt	Vertex figure	Picture
[56]	cantellated triangular (sritrah) = s_{2}{3,6,3}	(1) (3.6)^{2}	-	-	(2) (3.6.4.6)	(3.4.4)		
[60]	runcitruncated triangular (pritrah) = s_{2,3}{3,6,3}	(1) (6)^{3}	-	(1) (4.4.3)	(1) (3.6.4.6)	(2) (4.4.6)		
[137]	alternated hexagonal (ahexah) ( ↔ ) = ( ↔) s{3,6,3}	(3)^{6}	-	-	(3)^{6}	+(3)^{3}	(3.6.6)	
Scaliform	runcisnub triangular (pristrah) s_{3}{3,6,3}	r{6,3}	-	(3.4.4)	(3)^{6}	tricup		
Nonuniform	omnisnub triangular tiling honeycomb (snatrah) ht_{0,1,2,3}{3,6,3}	(3.3.3.3.6)	(3)^{4}	(3)^{4}	(3.3.3.3.6)	+(3)^{3}		

=== [4,4,3] family ===
There are 15 forms, generated by ring permutations of the Coxeter group: [4,4,3] or

#	Honeycomb name Coxeter diagram and Schläfli symbol	Cell counts/vertex and positions in honeycomb				Vertex figure	Picture
#	Honeycomb name Coxeter diagram and Schläfli symbol	0	1	2	3	Vertex figure	Picture
62	square (squah) = {4,4,3}	-	-	-	(6)	Cube	
63	rectified square (risquah) = t_{1}{4,4,3} or r{4,4,3}	(2)	-	-	(3)	Triangular prism	
64	rectified order-4 octahedral (rocth) t_{1}{3,4,4} or r{3,4,4}	(4)	-	-	(2)		
65	order-4 octahedral (octh) {3,4,4}	(∞)	-	-	-		
66	truncated square (tisquah) = t_{0,1}{4,4,3} or t{4,4,3}	(1)	-	-	(3)		
67	truncated order-4 octahedral (tocth) t_{0,1}{3,4,4} or t{3,4,4}	(4)	-	-	(1)		
68	bitruncated square (osquah) t_{1,2}{4,4,3} or 2t{4,4,3}	(2)	-	-	(2)		
69	cantellated square (srisquah) t_{0,2}{4,4,3} or rr{4,4,3}	(1)	(2)	-	(2)		
70	cantellated order-4 octahedral (srocth) t_{0,2}{3,4,4} or rr{3,4,4}	(2)	-	(2)	(1)		
71	runcinated square (sidposquah) t_{0,3}{4,4,3}	(1)	(3)	(3)	(1)		
72	cantitruncated square (grisquah) t_{0,1,2}{4,4,3} or tr{4,4,3}	(1)	(1)	-	(2)		
73	cantitruncated order-4 octahedral (grocth) t_{0,1,2}{3,4,4} or tr{3,4,4}	(2)	-	(1)	(1)		
74	runcitruncated square (procth) t_{0,1,3}{4,4,3}	(1)	(1)	(2)	(1)		
75	runcitruncated order-4 octahedral (prisquah) t_{0,1,3}{3,4,4}	(1)	(2)	(1)	(1)		
76	omnitruncated square (gidposquah) t_{0,1,2,3}{4,4,3}	(1)	(1)	(1)	(1)		

Alternated forms
#	Honeycomb name Coxeter diagram and Schläfli symbol	Cell counts/vertex and positions in honeycomb					Vertex figure	Picture
#	Honeycomb name Coxeter diagram and Schläfli symbol	0	1	2	3	Alt	Vertex figure	Picture
[83]	alternated square (asquah) ↔ h{4,4,3}	-	-	-	(6)	(8)		
[84]	cantic square (tasquah) ↔ h_{2}{4,4,3}	(1)	-	-	(2)	(2)		
[85]	runcic square ↔ h_{3}{4,4,3}	(1)	-	-	(1).	(4)		
[86]	runcicantic square ↔	(1)	-	-	(1)	(2)		
[153]	alternated rectified square ↔ hr{4,4,3}		-	-		{}x{3}		
157			-	-		{}x{6}		
Scaliform	snub order-4 octahedral = = s{3,4,4}		-	-		{}v{4}		
Scaliform	runcisnub order-4 octahedral s_{3}{3,4,4}					cup-4		
152	snub square = s{4,4,3}		-	-		{3,3}		
Nonuniform	snub rectified order-4 octahedral sr{3,4,4}		-			irr. {3,3}		
Nonuniform	alternated runcitruncated square ht_{0,1,3}{3,4,4}					irr. {}v{4}		
Nonuniform	omnisnub square ht_{0,1,2,3}{4,4,3}					irr. {3,3}		

=== [4,4,4] family ===
There are 9 forms, generated by ring permutations of the Coxeter group: [4,4,4] or.

#	Honeycomb name Coxeter diagram and Schläfli symbol	Cell counts/vertex and positions in honeycomb				Symmetry	Vertex figure	Picture
#	Honeycomb name Coxeter diagram and Schläfli symbol	0	1	2	3	Symmetry	Vertex figure	Picture
77	order-4 square (sisquah) {4,4,4}	-	-	-		[4,4,4]	Cube	
78	truncated order-4 square (tissish) t_{0,1}{4,4,4} or t{4,4,4}		-	-		[4,4,4]		
79	bitruncated order-4 square (dish) t_{1,2}{4,4,4} or 2t{4,4,4}		-	-		[[4,4,4]]		
80	runcinated order-4 square (spiddish) t_{0,3}{4,4,4}					[[4,4,4]]		
81	runcitruncated order-4 square (prissish) t_{0,1,3}{4,4,4}					[4,4,4]		
82	omnitruncated order-4 square (gipiddish) t_{0,1,2,3}{4,4,4}					[[4,4,4]]		
[62]	square (squah) ↔ t_{1}{4,4,4} or r{4,4,4}		-	-		[4,4,4]	Square tiling	
[63]	rectified square (risquah) ↔ t_{0,2}{4,4,4} or rr{4,4,4}			-		[4,4,4]		
[66]	truncated order-4 square (tisquah) ↔ t_{0,1,2}{4,4,4} or tr{4,4,4}			-		[4,4,4]		

Alternated constructions
#	Honeycomb name Coxeter diagram and Schläfli symbol	Cell counts/vertex and positions in honeycomb					Symmetry	Vertex figure	Picture
#	Honeycomb name Coxeter diagram and Schläfli symbol	0	1	2	3	Alt	Symmetry	Vertex figure	Picture
[62]	Square (squah) ( ↔ ↔ ↔ ) =	(4.4.4.4)	-	-		(4.4.4.4)	[1^{+},4,4,4] =[4,4,4]		
[63]	rectified square (risquah) = s_{2}{4,4,4}			-			[4^{+},4,4]		
[77]	order-4 square (sisquah) ↔ ↔ ↔	-	-	-			[1^{+},4,4,4] =[4,4,4]	Cube	
[78]	truncated order-4 square (tissish) ↔ ↔ ↔	(4.8.8)	-	(4.8.8)	-	(4.4.4.4)	[1^{+},4,4,4] =[4,4,4]		
[79]	bitruncated order-4 square (dish) ↔ ↔ ↔	(4.8.8)	-	-	(4.8.8)	(4.8.8)	[1^{+},4,4,4] =[4,4,4]		
[81]	runcitruncated order-4 square tiling (prissish) = s_{2,3}{4,4,4}						[4,4,4]		
[83]	alternated square (asquah) ( ↔ ) ↔ hr{4,4,4}		-	-			[4,1^{+},4,4]	(4.3.4.3)	
[104]	quarter order-4 square ↔ q{4,4,4}						[[1^{+},4,4,4,1^{+}]] =[[4^{[4]}]]		
153	alternated rectified square tiling ↔ ↔ hrr{4,4,4}			-			[((2^{+},4,4)),4]		
154	alternated runcinated order-4 square tiling ht_{0,3}{4,4,4}						[[(4,4,4,2^{+})]]		
156									
Scaliform	snub order-4 square tiling s{4,4,4}		-	-			[4^{+},4,4]		
Nonuniform	runcic snub order-4 square tiling s_{3}{4,4,4}						[4^{+},4,4]		
Nonuniform	bisnub order-4 square tiling 2s{4,4,4}		-	-			[[4,4^{+},4]]		
[152]	snub square tiling ↔ sr{4,4,4}			-			[(4,4)^{+},4]		
Nonuniform	alternated runcitruncated order-4 square tiling ht_{0,1,3}{4,4,4}						[((2,4)^{+},4,4)]		
Nonuniform	omnisnub order-4 square tiling ht_{0,1,2,3}{4,4,4}						[[4,4,4]]^{+}		

== Tridental graphs ==
=== [3,4^{1,1}] family ===
There are 11 forms (of which only 4 are not shared with the [4,4,3] family), generated by ring permutations of the Coxeter group:

#	Honeycomb name Coxeter diagram	Cells by location (and count around each vertex)				Vertex figure	Picture
#	Honeycomb name Coxeter diagram	0	1	0'	3	Vertex figure	Picture
83	alternated square (asquah) ↔	-	-	(4.4.4)	(4.4.4.4)	(4.3.4.3)	
84	cantic square (tasquah) ↔	(3.4.3.4)	-	(3.8.8)	(4.8.8)		
85	runcic square ↔	(4.4.4.4)	-	(3.4.4.4)	(4.4.4.4)		
86	runcicantic square ↔	(4.6.6)	-	(3.4.4.4)	(4.8.8)		
[63]	rectified square (risquah) ↔	(4.4.4)	-	(4.4.4)	(4.4.4.4)		
[64]	rectified order-4 octahedral (rocth) ↔	(3.4.3.4)	-	(3.4.3.4)	(4.4.4.4)		
[65]	order-4 octahedral (octh) ↔	(4.4.4.4)	-	(4.4.4.4)	-		
[67]	truncated order-4 octahedral (tocth) ↔	(4.6.6)	-	(4.6.6)	(4.4.4.4)		
[68]	bitruncated square (osquah) ↔	(3.8.8)	-	(3.8.8)	(4.8.8)		
[70]	cantellated order-4 octahedral (srocth) ↔	(3.4.4.4)	(4.4.4)	(3.4.4.4)	(4.4.4.4)		
[73]	cantitruncated order-4 octahedral (grocth) ↔	(4.6.8)	(4.4.4)	(4.6.8)	(4.8.8)		

#	Honeycomb name Coxeter diagram	Cells by location (and count around each vertex)					Vertex figure	Picture
#	Honeycomb name Coxeter diagram	0	1	0'	3	Alt	Vertex figure	Picture
Scaliform	snub order-4 octahedral = = s{3,4^{1,1}}		-	-		irr. {}v{4}		
Nonuniform	snub rectified order-4 octahedral ↔ sr{3,4^{1,1}}	(3.3.3.3.4)	(3.3.3)	(3.3.3.3.4)	(3.3.4.3.4)	+(3.3.3)		

=== [4,4^{1,1}] family ===
There are 7 forms, (all shared with [4,4,4] family), generated by ring permutations of the Coxeter group:

#	Honeycomb name Coxeter diagram	Cells by location				Vertex figure	Picture
#	Honeycomb name Coxeter diagram	0	1	0'	3	Vertex figure	Picture
[62]	Square (squah) ( ↔) =	(4.4.4.4)	-	(4.4.4.4)	(4.4.4.4)		
[62]	Square (squah) ( ↔) =	(4.4.4.4)	-	(4.4.4.4)	(4.4.4.4)		
[63]	rectified square (risquah) ( ↔) =	(4.4.4.4)	(4.4.4)	(4.4.4.4)	(4.4.4.4)		
[66]	truncated square (tisquah) ( ↔) =	(4.8.8)	(4.4.4)	(4.8.8)	(4.8.8)		
[77]	order-4 square (sisquah) ↔	(4.4.4.4)	-	(4.4.4.4)	-		
[78]	truncated order-4 square (tissish) ↔	(4.8.8)	-	(4.8.8)	(4.4.4.4)		
[79]	bitruncated order-4 square (dish) ↔	(4.8.8)	-	(4.8.8)	(4.8.8)		

#	Honeycomb name Coxeter diagram	Cells by location (and count around each vertex)					Vertex figure	Picture
#	Honeycomb name Coxeter diagram	0	1	0'	3	Alt	Vertex figure	Picture
[77]	order-4 square (sisquah) ( ↔ ↔) =		-		-	Cube		
[78]	truncated order-4 square (tissish) ( ↔) = ( ↔ )							
[83]	Alternated square (asquah) ↔		-					
Scaliform	Snub order-4 square		-					
Nonuniform			-					
Nonuniform			-					
[153]	( ↔ ) = ( ↔ )							
Nonuniform	Snub square ↔ ↔	(3.3.4.3.4)	(3.3.3)	(3.3.4.3.4)	(3.3.4.3.4)	+(3.3.3)		

=== [6,3^{1,1}] family ===
There are 11 forms (and only 4 not shared with [6,3,4] family), generated by ring permutations of the Coxeter group: [6,3^{1,1}] or.

#	Honeycomb name Coxeter diagram	Cells by location (and count around each vertex)				Vertex figure	Picture
#	Honeycomb name Coxeter diagram	0	1	0'	3	Vertex figure	Picture
87	alternated order-6 cubic (ahach) ↔	-	-	(∞) (3.3.3.3.3)	(∞) (3.3.3)	(3.6.3.6)	
88	cantic order-6 cubic (tachach) ↔	(1) (3.6.3.6)	-	(2) (6.6.6)	(2) (3.6.6)		
89	runcic order-6 cubic (birachach) ↔	(1) (6.6.6)	-	(3) (3.4.6.4)	(1) (3.3.3)		
90	runcicantic order-6 cubic (bitachach) ↔	(1) (3.12.12)	-	(2) (4.6.12)	(1) (3.6.6)		
[16]	order-4 hexagonal (shexah) ↔	(4) (6.6.6)	-	(4) (6.6.6)	-	(3.3.3.3)	
[17]	rectified order-4 hexagonal (rishexah) ↔	(2) (3.6.3.6)	-	(2) (3.6.3.6)	(2) (3.3.3.3)		
[18]	rectified order-6 cubic (rihach) ↔	(1) (3.3.3.3.3)	-	(1) (3.3.3.3.3)	(6) (3.4.3.4)		
[20]	truncated order-4 hexagonal (tishexah) ↔	(2) (3.12.12)	-	(2) (3.12.12)	(1) (3.3.3.3)		
[21]	bitruncated order-6 cubic (chexah) ↔	(1) (6.6.6)	-	(1) (6.6.6)	(2) (4.6.6)		
[24]	cantellated order-6 cubic (srihach) ↔	(1) (3.4.6.4)	(2) (4.4.4)	(1) (3.4.6.4)	(1) (3.4.3.4)		
[27]	cantitruncated order-6 cubic (grihach) ↔	(1) (4.6.12)	(1) (4.4.4)	(1) (4.6.12)	(1) (4.6.6)		

#	Honeycomb name Coxeter diagram	Cells by location (and count around each vertex)					Vertex figure	Picture
#	Honeycomb name Coxeter diagram	0	1	0'	3	Alt	Vertex figure	Picture
[141]	alternated order-4 hexagonal (ashexah) ↔ ↔ ↔						(4.6.6)	
Nonuniform	bisnub order-4 hexagonal ↔							
Nonuniform	snub rectified order-4 hexagonal ↔	(3.3.3.3.6)	(3.3.3)	(3.3.3.3.6)	(3.3.3.3.3)	+(3.3.3)		

== Cyclic graphs ==
=== [(4,4,3,3)] family ===
There are 11 forms, 4 unique to this family, generated by ring permutations of the Coxeter group:, with ↔.

#	Honeycomb name Coxeter diagram	Cells by location				Vertex figure	Picture
#	Honeycomb name Coxeter diagram	0	1	2	3	Vertex figure	Picture
91	tetrahedral-square	-	(6) (444)	(8) (333)	(12) (3434)	(3444)	
92	cyclotruncated square-tetrahedral	(444)	(488)	(333)	(388)		
93	cyclotruncated tetrahedral-square	(1) (3333)	(1) (444)	(4) (366)	(4) (466)		
94	truncated tetrahedral-square	(1) (3444)	(1) (488)	(1) (366)	(2) (468)		
[64]	( ↔ ) = rectified order-4 octahedral (rocth)	(3434)	(4444)	(3434)	(3434)		
[65]	( ↔ ) = order-4 octahedral (octh)	(3333)	-	(3333)	(3333)		
[67]	( ↔ ) = truncated order-4 octahedral (tocth)	(466)	(4444)	(3434)	(466)		
[83]	alternated square (asquah) ( ↔) =	(444)	(4444)	-	(444)	(4.3.4.3)	
[84]	cantic square (tasquah) ( ↔) =	(388)	(488)	(3434)	(388)		
[85]	runcic square ( ↔) =	(3444)	(3434)	(3333)	(3444)		
[86]	runcicantic square ( ↔) =	(468)	(488)	(466)	(468)		

#	Honeycomb name Coxeter diagram	Cells by location					Vertex figure	Picture
#	Honeycomb name Coxeter diagram	0	1	2	3	Alt	Vertex figure	Picture
Scaliform	snub order-4 octahedral = =		-	-		irr. {}v{4}		
Nonuniform								
[91]	tetrahedral-square ↔					r{4,3}		

=== [(4,4,4,3)] family ===
There are 9 forms, generated by ring permutations of the Coxeter group:.

#	Honeycomb name Coxeter diagram	Cells by location (and count around each vertex)				Vertex figure	Picture
#	Honeycomb name Coxeter diagram	0	1	2	3	Vertex figure	Picture
95	cubic-square	(8) (4.4.4)	-	(6) (4.4.4.4)	(12) (4.4.4.4)	(3.4.4.4)	
96	octahedral-square	(3.4.3.4)	(3.3.3.3)	-	(4.4.4.4)	(4.4.4.4)	
97	cyclotruncated cubic-square	(4) (3.8.8)	(1) (3.3.3.3)	(1) (4.4.4.4)	(4) (4.8.8)		
98	cyclotruncated square-cubic	(1) (4.4.4)	(1) (4.4.4)	(3) (4.8.8)	(3) (4.8.8)		
99	cyclotruncated octahedral-square	(4) (4.6.6)	(4) (4.6.6)	(1) (4.4.4.4)	(1) (4.4.4.4)		
100	rectified cubic-square	(1) (3.4.3.4)	(2) (3.4.4.4)	(1) (4.4.4.4)	(2) (4.4.4.4)		
101	truncated cubic-square	(1) (4.8.8)	(1) (3.4.4.4)	(2) (4.8.8)	(1) (4.8.8)		
102	truncated octahedral-square	(2) (4.6.8	(1) (4.6.6)	(1) (4.4.4.4)	(1) (4.8.8)		
103	omnitruncated octahedral-square	(1) (4.6.8)	(1) (4.6.8)	(1) (4.8.8)	(1) (4.8.8)		

Alternated forms
#	Honeycomb name Coxeter diagram	Cells by location (and count around each vertex)					Vertex figure
#	Honeycomb name Coxeter diagram	0	1	2	3	Alt	Vertex figure
155	alternated cubic-square ↔	-				(3.4.4.4)	
Nonuniform	snub octahedral-square						
Nonuniform	cyclosnub square-cubic						
Nonuniform	cyclosnub octahedral-square						
Nonuniform	omnisnub cubic-square	(3.3.3.3.4)	(3.3.3.3.4)	(3.3.4.3.4)	(3.3.4.3.4)	+(3.3.3)	

=== [(4,4,4,4)] family ===
There are 5 forms, 1 unique, generated by ring permutations of the Coxeter group:. Repeat constructions are related as: ↔, ↔, and ↔.

#	Honeycomb name Coxeter diagram	Cells by location (and count around each vertex)				Vertex figure	Picture
#	Honeycomb name Coxeter diagram	0	1	2	3	Vertex figure	Picture
104	quarter order-4 square ↔	(4.8.8)	(4.4.4.4)	(4.4.4.4)	(4.8.8)		
[62]	square (squah) ↔ ↔	(4.4.4.4)	(4.4.4.4)	(4.4.4.4)	(4.4.4.4)		
[77]	order-4 square (sisquah) ( ↔ ) =	(4.4.4.4)	-	(4.4.4.4)	(4.4.4.4)	(4.4.4.4)	
[78]	truncated order-4 square (tissish) ( ↔ ) =	(4.8.8)	(4.4.4.4)	(4.8.8)	(4.8.8)		
[79]	bitruncated order-4 square (dish) ↔	(4.8.8)	(4.8.8)	(4.8.8)	(4.8.8)		

Alternated forms
#	Honeycomb name Coxeter diagram	Cells by location (and count around each vertex)					Vertex figure
#	Honeycomb name Coxeter diagram	0	1	2	3	Alt	Vertex figure
[83]	alternated square (asquah) ( ↔ ↔) =	(6) (4.4.4.4)	(6) (4.4.4.4)	(6) (4.4.4.4)	(6) (4.4.4.4)	(8) (4.4.4)	(4.3.4.3)
[77]	alternated order-4 square (sisquah) ↔		-				
158	cantic order-4 square ↔						
Nonuniform	cyclosnub square						
Nonuniform	snub order-4 square						
Nonuniform	bisnub order-4 square ↔	(3.3.4.3.4)	(3.3.4.3.4)	(3.3.4.3.4)	(3.3.4.3.4)	+(3.3.3)	

=== [(6,3,3,3)] family ===
There are 9 forms, generated by ring permutations of the Coxeter group:.

#	Honeycomb name Coxeter diagram	Cells by location (and count around each vertex)				Vertex figure
#	Honeycomb name Coxeter diagram	0	1	2	3	Vertex figure
105	tetrahedral-hexagonal	(4) (3.3.3)	-	(4) (6.6.6)	(6) (3.6.3.6)	(3.4.3.4)
106	tetrahedral-triangular	(3.3.3.3)	(3.3.3)	-	(3.3.3.3.3.3)	(3.4.6.4)
107	cyclotruncated tetrahedral-hexagonal	(3) (3.6.6)	(1) (3.3.3)	(1) (6.6.6)	(3) (6.6.6)	
108	cyclotruncated hexagonal-tetrahedral	(1) (3.3.3)	(1) (3.3.3)	(4) (3.12.12)	(4) (3.12.12)	
109	cyclotruncated tetrahedral-triangular	(6) (3.6.6)	(6) (3.6.6)	(1) (3.3.3.3.3.3)	(1) (3.3.3.3.3.3)	
110	rectified tetrahedral-hexagonal	(1) (3.3.3.3)	(2) (3.4.3.4)	(1) (3.6.3.6)	(2) (3.4.6.4)	
111	truncated tetrahedral-hexagonal	(1) (3.6.6)	(1) (3.4.3.4)	(1) (3.12.12)	(2) (4.6.12)	
112	truncated tetrahedral-triangular	(2) (4.6.6)	(1) (3.6.6)	(1) (3.4.6.4)	(1) (6.6.6)	
113	omnitruncated tetrahedral-hexagonal	(1) (4.6.6)	(1) (4.6.6)	(1) (4.6.12)	(1) (4.6.12)	

Alternated forms
#	Honeycomb name Coxeter diagram	Cells by location (and count around each vertex)					Vertex figure
#	Honeycomb name Coxeter diagram	0	1	2	3	Alt	Vertex figure
Nonuniform	omnisnub tetrahedral-hexagonal	(3.3.3.3.3)	(3.3.3.3.3)	(3.3.3.3.6)	(3.3.3.3.6)	+(3.3.3)	

=== [(6,3,4,3)] family ===
There are 9 forms, generated by ring permutations of the Coxeter group:

#	Honeycomb name Coxeter diagram	Cells by location (and count around each vertex)				Vertex figure
#	Honeycomb name Coxeter diagram	0	1	2	3	Vertex figure
114	octahedral-hexagonal	(6) (3.3.3.3)	-	(8) (6.6.6)	(12) (3.6.3.6)	
115	cubic-triangular	(∞) (3.4.3.4)	(∞) (4.4.4)	-	(∞) (3.3.3.3.3.3)	(3.4.6.4)
116	cyclotruncated octahedral-hexagonal	(3) (4.6.6)	(1) (4.4.4)	(1) (6.6.6)	(3) (6.6.6)	
117	cyclotruncated hexagonal-octahedral	(1) (3.3.3.3)	(1) (3.3.3.3)	(4) (3.12.12)	(4) (3.12.12)	
118	cyclotruncated cubic-triangular	(6) (3.8.8)	(6) (3.8.8)	(1) (3.3.3.3.3.3)	(1) (3.3.3.3.3.3)	
119	rectified octahedral-hexagonal	(1) (3.4.3.4)	(2) (3.4.4.4)	(1) (3.6.3.6)	(2) (3.4.6.4)	
120	truncated octahedral-hexagonal	(1) (4.6.6)	(1) (3.4.4.4)	(1) (3.12.12)	(2) (4.6.12)	
121	truncated cubic-triangular	(2) (4.6.8)	(1) (3.8.8)	(1) (3.4.6.4)	(1) (6.6.6)	
122	omnitruncated octahedral-hexagonal	(1) (4.6.8)	(1) (4.6.8)	(1) (4.6.12)	(1) (4.6.12)	

Alternated forms
#	Honeycomb name Coxeter diagram	Cells by location (and count around each vertex)					Vertex figure
#	Honeycomb name Coxeter diagram	0	1	2	3	Alt	Vertex figure
Nonuniform	cyclosnub octahedral-hexagonal	(3.3.3.3.3)	(3.3.3)	(3.3.3.3.3.3)	(3.3.3.3.3.3)	irr. {3,4}	
Nonuniform	omnisnub octahedral-hexagonal	(3.3.3.3.4)	(3.3.3.3.4)	(3.3.3.3.6)	(3.3.3.3.6)	irr. {3,3}	

=== [(6,3,5,3)] family ===
There are 9 forms, generated by ring permutations of the Coxeter group:

#	Honeycomb name Coxeter diagram	Cells by location (and count around each vertex)				Vertex figure	Picture
#	Honeycomb name Coxeter diagram	0	1	2	3	Vertex figure	Picture
123	icosahedral-hexagonal	(6) (3.3.3.3.3)	-	(8) (6.6.6)	(12) (3.6.3.6)	3.4.5.4	
124	dodecahedral-triangular	(30) (3.5.3.5)	(20) (5.5.5)	-	(12) (3.3.3.3.3.3)	(3.4.6.4)	
125	cyclotruncated icosahedral-hexagonal	(3) (5.6.6)	(1) (5.5.5)	(1) (6.6.6)	(3) (6.6.6)		
126	cyclotruncated hexagonal-icosahedral	(1) (3.3.3.3.3)	(1) (3.3.3.3.3)	(5) (3.12.12)	(5) (3.12.12)		
127	cyclotruncated dodecahedral-triangular	(6) (3.10.10)	(6) (3.10.10)	(1) (3.3.3.3.3.3)	(1) (3.3.3.3.3.3)		
128	rectified icosahedral-hexagonal	(1) (3.5.3.5)	(2) (3.4.5.4)	(1) (3.6.3.6)	(2) (3.4.6.4)		
129	truncated icosahedral-hexagonal	(1) (5.6.6)	(1) (3.5.5.5)	(1) (3.12.12)	(2) (4.6.12)		
130	truncated dodecahedral-triangular	(2) (4.6.10)	(1) (3.10.10)	(1) (3.4.6.4)	(1) (6.6.6)		
131	omnitruncated icosahedral-hexagonal	(1) (4.6.10)	(1) (4.6.10)	(1) (4.6.12)	(1) (4.6.12)		

Alternated forms
#	Honeycomb name Coxeter diagram	Cells by location (and count around each vertex)					Vertex figure	Picture
#	Honeycomb name Coxeter diagram	0	1	2	3	Alt	Vertex figure	Picture
Nonuniform	omnisnub icosahedral-hexagonal	(3.3.3.3.5)	(3.3.3.3.5)	(3.3.3.3.6)	(3.3.3.3.6)	+(3.3.3)		

=== [(6,3,6,3)] family ===
There are 6 forms, generated by ring permutations of the Coxeter group:.

#	Honeycomb name Coxeter diagram	Cells by location (and count around each vertex)				Vertex figure	Picture
#	Honeycomb name Coxeter diagram	0	1	2	3	Vertex figure	Picture
132	hexagonal-triangular	(3.3.3.3.3.3)	-	(6.6.6)	(3.6.3.6)	(3.4.6.4)	
133	cyclotruncated hexagonal-triangular	(1) (3.3.3.3.3.3)	(1) (3.3.3.3.3.3)	(3) (3.12.12)	(3) (3.12.12)		
134	cyclotruncated triangular-hexagonal	(1) (3.6.3.6)	(2) (3.4.6.4)	(1) (3.6.3.6)	(2) (3.4.6.4)		
135	rectified hexagonal-triangular	(1) (6.6.6)	(1) (3.4.6.4)	(1) (3.12.12)	(2) (4.6.12)		
136	truncated hexagonal-triangular	(1) (4.6.12)	(1) (4.6.12)	(1) (4.6.12)	(1) (4.6.12)		
[16]	order-4 hexagonal tiling (shexah) =	(3) (6.6.6)	(1) (6.6.6)	(1) (6.6.6)	(3) (6.6.6)	(3.3.3.3)	

Alternated forms
#	Honeycomb name Coxeter diagram	Cells by location (and count around each vertex)					Vertex figure	Picture
#	Honeycomb name Coxeter diagram	0	1	2	3	Alt	Vertex figure	Picture
[141]	alternated order-4 hexagonal (ashexah) ↔ ↔ ↔	(3.3.3.3.3.3)	(3.3.3.3.3.3)	(3.3.3.3.3.3)	(3.3.3.3.3.3)	+(3.3.3.3)	(4.6.6)	
Nonuniform	cyclocantisnub hexagonal-triangular							
Nonuniform	cycloruncicantisnub hexagonal-triangular							
Nonuniform	snub rectified hexagonal-triangular	(3.3.3.3.6)	(3.3.3.3.6)	(3.3.3.3.6)	(3.3.3.3.6)	+(3.3.3)		

== Loop-n-tail graphs ==
=== [3,3^{[3]}] family ===
There are 11 forms, 4 unique, generated by ring permutations of the Coxeter group: [3,3^{[3]}] or. 7 are half symmetry forms of [3,3,6]: ↔.

#	Honeycomb name Coxeter diagram	Cells by location (and count around each vertex)				vertex figure	Picture
#	Honeycomb name Coxeter diagram	0	1	0'	3	vertex figure	Picture
137	alternated hexagonal (ahexah) ( ↔) =	-	-	(3.3.3)	(3.3.3.3.3.3)	(3.6.6)	
138	cantic hexagonal (tahexah) ↔	(1) (3.3.3.3)	-	(2) (3.6.6)	(2) (3.6.3.6)		
139	runcic hexagonal (birahexah) ↔	(1) (4.4.4)	(1) (4.4.3)	(3) (3.4.3.4)	(1) (3.3.3.3.3.3)		
140	runcicantic hexagonal (bitahexah) ↔	(1) (3.10.10)	(1) (4.4.3)	(2) (4.6.6)	(1) (3.6.3.6)		
[2]	rectified hexagonal (rihexah) ↔	(1) (3.3.3)	-	(1) (3.3.3)	(6) (3.6.3.6)	Triangular prism	
[3]	rectified order-6 tetrahedral (rath) ↔	(2) (3.3.3.3)	-	(2) (3.3.3.3)	(2) (3.3.3.3.3.3)	Hexagonal prism	
[4]	order-6 tetrahedral (thon) ↔	(4) (4.4.4)	-	(4) (4.4.4)	-		
[8]	cantellated order-6 tetrahedral (srath) ↔	(1) (3.3.3.3)	(2) (4.4.6)	(1) (3.3.3.3)	(1) (3.6.3.6)		
[9]	bitruncated order-6 tetrahedral (tehexah) ↔	(1) (3.6.6)	-	(1) (3.6.6)	(2) (6.6.6)		
[10]	truncated order-6 tetrahedral (tath) ↔	(2) (3.10.10)	-	(2) (3.10.10)	(1) (3.6.3.6)		
[14]	cantitruncated order-6 tetrahedral (grath) ↔	(1) (4.6.6)	(1) (4.4.6)	(1) (4.6.6)	(1) (6.6.6)		

Alternated forms
#	Honeycomb name Coxeter diagram	Cells by location (and count around each vertex)					vertex figure
#	Honeycomb name Coxeter diagram	0	1	0'	3	Alt	vertex figure
Nonuniform	snub rectified order-6 tetrahedral ↔	(3.3.3.3.3)	(3.3.3.3)	(3.3.3.3.3)	(3.3.3.3.3.3)	+(3.3.3)	

=== [4,3^{[3]}] family ===
There are 11 forms, 4 unique, generated by ring permutations of the Coxeter group: [4,3^{[3]}] or. 7 are half symmetry forms of [4,3,6]: ↔.

#	Honeycomb name Coxeter diagram	Cells by location (and count around each vertex)				vertex figure	Picture
#	Honeycomb name Coxeter diagram	0	1	0'	3	vertex figure	Picture
141	alternated order-4 hexagonal (ashexah) ↔	-	-	(3.3.3.3)	(3.3.3.3.3.3)	(4.6.6)	
142	cantic order-4 hexagonal (tashexah) ↔ ↔	(1) (3.4.3.4)	-	(2) (4.6.6)	(2) (3.6.3.6)		
143	runcic order-4 hexagonal (birashexah) ↔	(1) (4.4.4)	(1) (4.4.3)	(3) (3.4.4.4)	(1) (3.3.3.3.3.3)		
144	runcicantic order-4 hexagonal (bitashexah) ↔	(1) (3.8.8)	(1) (4.4.3)	(2) (4.6.8)	(1) (3.6.3.6)		
[16]	order-4 hexagonal (shexah) ↔	(4) (4.4.4)	-	(4) (4.4.4)	-		
[17]	rectified order-4 hexagonal (rishexah) ↔	(1) (3.3.3.3)	-	(1) (3.3.3.3)	(6) (3.6.3.6)		
[18]	rectified order-6 cubic (rihach) ↔	(2) (3.4.3.4)	-	(2) (3.4.3.4)	(2) (3.3.3.3.3.3)		
[21]	bitruncated order-4 hexagonal (chexah) ↔	(1) (4.6.6)	-	(1) (4.6.6)	(2) (6.6.6)		
[22]	truncated order-6 cubic (thach) ↔	(2) (3.8.8)	-	(2) (3.8.8)	(1) (3.6.3.6)		
[23]	cantellated order-4 hexagonal (srishexah) ↔	(1) (3.4.4.4)	(2) (4.4.6)	(1) (3.4.4.4)	(1) (3.6.3.6)		
[26]	cantitruncated order-4 hexagonal (grishexah) ↔	(1) (4.6.8)	(1) (4.4.6)	(1) (4.6.8)	(1) (6.6.6)		

Alternated forms
#	Honeycomb name Coxeter diagram	Cells by location (and count around each vertex)					vertex figure
#	Honeycomb name Coxeter diagram	0	1	0'	3	Alt	vertex figure
Nonuniform	snub rectified order-4 hexagonal ↔	(3.3.3.3.4)	(3.3.3.3)	(3.3.3.3.4)	(3.3.3.3.3.3)	+(3.3.3)	

=== [5,3^{[3]}] family ===
There are 11 forms, 4 unique, generated by ring permutations of the Coxeter group: [5,3^{[3]}] or. 7 are half symmetry forms of [5,3,6]: ↔.

#	Honeycomb name Coxeter diagram	Cells by location (and count around each vertex)				vertex figure	Picture
#	Honeycomb name Coxeter diagram	0	1	0'	3	vertex figure	Picture
145	alternated order-5 hexagonal (aphexah) ↔	-	-	(3.3.3.3.3)	(3.3.3.3.3.3)	(3.6.3.6)	
146	cantic order-5 hexagonal (taphexah) ↔	(1) (3.5.3.5)	-	(2) (5.6.6)	(2) (3.6.3.6)		
147	runcic order-5 hexagonal (biraphexah) ↔	(1) (5.5.5)	(1) (4.4.3)	(3) (3.4.5.4)	(1) (3.3.3.3.3.3)		
148	runcicantic order-5 hexagonal (bitaphexah) ↔	(1) (3.10.10)	(1) (4.4.3)	(2) (4.6.10)	(1) (3.6.3.6)		
[32]	rectified order-5 hexagonal (riphexah) ↔	(1) (3.3.3.3.3)	-	(1) (3.3.3.3.3)	(6) (3.6.3.6)		
[33]	rectified order-6 dodecahedral (rihed) ↔	(2) (3.5.3.5)	-	(2) (3.5.3.5)	(2) (3.3.3.3.3.3)		
[34]	Order-5 hexagonal (hedhon) ↔	(4) (5.5.5)	-	(4) (5.5.5)	-		
[40]	truncated order-6 dodecahedral (thed) ↔	(2) (3.10.10)	-	(2) (3.10.10)	(1) (3.6.3.6)		
[36]	cantellated order-5 hexagonal (sriphexah) ↔	(1) (3.4.5.4)	(2) (6.4.4)	(1) (3.4.5.4)	(1) (3.6.3.6)		
[39]	bitruncated order-5 hexagonal (dohexah) ↔	(1) (5.6.6)	-	(1) (5.6.6)	(2) (6.6.6)		
[41]	cantitruncated order-5 hexagonal (griphexah) ↔	(1) (4.6.10)	(1) (6.4.4)	(1) (4.6.10)	(1) (6.6.6)		

Alternated forms
#	Honeycomb name Coxeter diagram	Cells by location (and count around each vertex)					vertex figure	Picture
#	Honeycomb name Coxeter diagram	0	1	0'	3	Alt	vertex figure	Picture
Nonuniform	snub rectified order-5 hexagonal ↔	(3.3.3.3.5)	(3.3.3)	(3.3.3.3.5)	(3.3.3.3.3.3)	+(3.3.3)		

=== [6,3^{[3]}] family ===
There are 11 forms, 4 unique, generated by ring permutations of the Coxeter group: [6,3^{[3]}] or. 7 are half symmetry forms of [6,3,6]: ↔.

#	Honeycomb name Coxeter diagram	Cells by location (and count around each vertex)				vertex figure	Picture
#	Honeycomb name Coxeter diagram	0	1	0'	3	vertex figure	Picture
149	runcic order-6 hexagonal (sirhahihexah) ↔	(1) (6.6.6)	(1) (4.4.3)	(3) (3.4.6.4)	(1) (3.3.3.3.3.3)		
150	runcicantic order-6 hexagonal (girhahihexah) ↔	(1) (3.12.12)	(1) (4.4.3)	(2) (4.6.12)	(1) (3.6.3.6)		
[1]	hexagonal (hexah) ↔ ↔ ↔	(1) (6.6.6)	-	(1) (6.6.6)	(2) (6.6.6)		
[46]	order-6 hexagonal (hihexah) ↔	(4) (6.6.6)	-	(4) (6.6.6)	-		
[47]	rectified order-6 hexagonal (rihihexah) ↔	(2) (3.6.3.6)	-	(2) (3.6.3.6)	(2) (3.3.3.3.3.3)		
[47]	rectified order-6 hexagonal (rihihexah) ↔	(1) (3.3.3.3.3.3)	-	(1) (3.3.3.3.3.3)	(6) (3.6.3.6)		
[48]	truncated order-6 hexagonal (thihexah) ↔	(2) (3.12.12)	-	(2) (3.12.12)	(1) (3.3.3.3.3.3)		
[49]	cantellated order-6 hexagonal (srihihexah) ↔	(1) (3.4.6.4)	(2) (6.4.4)	(1) (3.4.6.4)	(1) (3.6.3.6)		
[51]	cantitruncated order-6 hexagonal (grihihexah) ↔	(1) (4.6.12)	(1) (6.4.4)	(1) (4.6.12)	(1) (6.6.6)		
[54]	triangular tiling honeycomb (trah) ( ↔ ) =	-	-	(3.3.3.3.3.3)	(3.3.3.3.3.3)	(6.6.6)	
[55]	cantic order-6 hexagonal (ritrah) ( ↔ ) =	(1) (3.6.3.6)	-	(2) (6.6.6)	(2) (3.6.3.6)		

Alternated forms
#	Honeycomb name Coxeter diagram	Cells by location (and count around each vertex)					vertex figure	Picture
#	Honeycomb name Coxeter diagram	0	1	0'	3	Alt	vertex figure	Picture
[54]	triangular tiling honeycomb (trah) ( ↔ ↔ ) =		-		-		(6.6.6)	
[137]	alternated hexagonal (ahexah) ( ↔ ) = ( ↔ )		-			+(3.6.6)	(3.6.6)	
[47]	rectified order-6 hexagonal (rihihexah) ↔ ↔ ↔	(3.6.3.6)	-	(3.6.3.6)	(3.3.3.3.3.3)			
[55]	cantic order-6 hexagonal (ritrah) ( ↔ ) = ( ↔ ) =	(1) (3.6.3.6)	-	(2) (6.6.6)	(2) (3.6.3.6)			
Nonuniform	snub rectified order-6 hexagonal ↔	(3.3.3.3.6)	(3.3.3.3)	(3.3.3.3.6)	(3.3.3.3.3.3)	+(3.3.3)		

== Multicyclic graphs ==
=== [3^{[ ]×[ ]}] family ===
There are 8 forms, 1 unique, generated by ring permutations of the Coxeter group:. Two are duplicated as ↔, two as ↔, and three as ↔.

#	Honeycomb name Coxeter diagram	Cells by location (and count around each vertex)				Vertex figure	Picture
#	Honeycomb name Coxeter diagram	0	1	2	3	Vertex figure	Picture
151	Quarter order-4 hexagonal (quishexah) ↔						
[17]	rectified order-4 hexagonal (rishexah) ↔ ↔ ↔					(4.4.4)	
[18]	rectified order-6 cubic (rihach) ↔ ↔ ↔					(6.4.4)	
[21]	bitruncated order-6 cubic (chexah) ↔ ↔ ↔						
[87]	alternated order-6 cubic (ahach) ↔ ↔	-				(3.6.3.6)	
[88]	cantic order-6 cubic (tachach) ↔ ↔						
[141]	alternated order-4 hexagonal (ashexah) ↔ ↔		-			(4.6.6)	
[142]	cantic order-4 hexagonal (tashexah) ↔ ↔						

#	Honeycomb name Coxeter diagram	Cells by location (and count around each vertex)					Vertex figure	Picture
#	Honeycomb name Coxeter diagram	0	1	2	3	Alt	Vertex figure	Picture
Nonuniform	bisnub order-6 cubic ↔					irr. {3,3}		

=== [3^{[3,3]}] family ===
There are 4 forms, 0 unique, generated by ring permutations of the Coxeter group:. They are repeated in four families: ↔ (index 2 subgroup), ↔ (index 4 subgroup), ↔ (index 6 subgroup), and ↔ (index 24 subgroup).

#	Name Coxeter diagram	0	1	2	3	vertex figure	Picture
[1]	hexagonal (hexah) ↔					{3,3}	
[47]	rectified order-6 hexagonal (rihihexah) ↔					t{2,3}	
[54]	triangular tiling honeycomb (trah) ( ↔ ) =		-			t{3^{[3]}}	
[55]	rectified triangular (ritrah) ↔					t{2,3}	

#	Name Coxeter diagram	0	1	2	3	Alt	vertex figure	Picture
[137]	alternated hexagonal (ahexah) ( ↔ ) =	s{3^{[3]}}	s{3^{[3]}}	s{3^{[3]}}	s{3^{[3]}}	{3,3}	(4.6.6)	

== Summary enumerations by family ==
=== Linear graphs ===
Paracompact hyperbolic enumeration
Group	Extended symmetry	Honeycombs		Chiral extended symmetry	Alternation honeycombs	
${\bar{R}}_3$ [4,4,3]	[4,4,3]	15	| | | | | | | | | | | |	[1^{+},4,1^{+},4,3^{+}]	(6)	(↔) (↔) | |
${\bar{R}}_3$ [4,4,3]	[4,4,3]	15	| | | | | | | | | | | |	[4,4,3]^{+}	(1)	
${\bar{N}}_3$ [4,4,4]	[4,4,4]	3	| |	[1^{+},4,1^{+},4,1^{+},4,1^{+}]	(3)	(↔ =) |
${\bar{N}}_3$ [4,4,4]	[4,4,4] ↔	(3)	| |	[1^{+},4,1^{+},4,1^{+},4,1^{+}]	(3)	(↔) |
${\bar{N}}_3$ [4,4,4]	[2^{+}[4,4,4]]	3	| |	[2^{+}[(4,4^{+},4,2^{+})]]	(2)	|
${\bar{N}}_3$ [4,4,4]	[2^{+}[4,4,4]]	3	| |	[2^{+}[4,4,4]]^{+}	(1)	
${\bar{V}}_3$ [6,3,3]	[6,3,3]	15	| | | | | | | | | | | |	[1^{+},6,(3,3)^{+}]	(2)	(↔)
${\bar{V}}_3$ [6,3,3]	[6,3,3]	15	| | | | | | | | | | | |	[6,3,3]^{+}	(1)	
${\bar{BV}}_3$ [6,3,4]	[6,3,4]	15	| | | | | | | | | | | |	[1^{+},6,3^{+},4,1^{+}]	(6)	(↔) (↔) | |
${\bar{BV}}_3$ [6,3,4]	[6,3,4]	15	| | | | | | | | | | | |	[6,3,4]^{+}	(1)	
${\bar{HV}}_3$ [6,3,5]	[6,3,5]	15	| | | | | | | | | | | |	[1^{+},6,(3,5)^{+}]	(2)	(↔)
${\bar{HV}}_3$ [6,3,5]	[6,3,5]	15	| | | | | | | | | | | |	[6,3,5]^{+}	(1)	
${\bar{Y}}_3$ [3,6,3]	[3,6,3]	5	| | | |			
${\bar{Y}}_3$ [3,6,3]	[3,6,3] ↔	(1)		[2^{+}[3^{+},6,3^{+}]]	(1)	
${\bar{Y}}_3$ [3,6,3]	[2^{+}[3,6,3]]	3	| |	[2^{+}[3,6,3]]^{+}	(1)	
${\bar{Z}}_3$ [6,3,6]	[6,3,6]	6	| | | |	[1^{+},6,3^{+},6,1^{+}]	(2)	(↔)
${\bar{Z}}_3$ [6,3,6]	[2^{+}[6,3,6]] ↔	(1)		[2^{+}[(6,3^{+},6,2^{+})]]	(2)	
${\bar{Z}}_3$ [6,3,6]	[2^{+}[6,3,6]]	2	|	[2^{+}[(6,3^{+},6,2^{+})]]	(2)	
${\bar{Z}}_3$ [6,3,6]	[2^{+}[6,3,6]]	2	|	[2^{+}[6,3,6]]^{+}	(1)	

=== Tridental graphs ===
Paracompact hyperbolic enumeration
Group	Extended symmetry	Honeycombs		Chiral extended symmetry	Alternation honeycombs	
${\bar{DV}}_3$ [6,3^{1,1}]	[6,3^{1,1}]	4	| | |			
${\bar{DV}}_3$ [6,3^{1,1}]	[1[6,3^{1,1}]]=[6,3,4] ↔	(7)	| | | | | |	[1[1^{+},6,3^{1,1}]]^{+}	(2)	(↔)
${\bar{DV}}_3$ [6,3^{1,1}]	[1[6,3^{1,1}]]=[6,3,4] ↔	(7)	| | | | | |	[1[6,3^{1,1}]]^{+}=[6,3,4]^{+}	(1)	
${\bar{O}}_3$ [3,4^{1,1}]	[3,4^{1,1}]	4	| | |	[3^{+},4^{1,1}]^{+}	(2)	↔
${\bar{O}}_3$ [3,4^{1,1}]	[1[3,4^{1,1}]]=[3,4,4] ↔	(7)	| | | | | |	[1[3^{+},4^{1,1}]]^{+}	(2)	|
${\bar{O}}_3$ [3,4^{1,1}]	[1[3,4^{1,1}]]=[3,4,4] ↔	(7)	| | | | | |	[1[3,4^{1,1}]]^{+}	(1)	
${\bar{M}}_3$ [4^{1,1,1}]	[4^{1,1,1}]	0	(none)			
${\bar{M}}_3$ [4^{1,1,1}]	[1[4^{1,1,1}]]=[4,4,4] ↔	(4)	| | |	[1[1^{+},4,1^{+},4^{1,1}]]^{+}=[(4,1^{+},4,1^{+},4,2^{+})]	(4)	(↔) | |
${\bar{M}}_3$ [4^{1,1,1}]	[3[4^{1,1,1}]]=[4,4,3] ↔	(3)	| |	[3[1^{+},4^{1,1,1}]]^{+}=[1^{+},4,1^{+},4,3^{+}]	(2)	(↔)
${\bar{M}}_3$ [4^{1,1,1}]	[3[4^{1,1,1}]]=[4,4,3] ↔	(3)	| |	[3[4^{1,1,1}]]^{+}=[4,4,3]^{+}	(1)	

=== Cyclic graphs ===
Paracompact hyperbolic enumeration
Group	Extended symmetry	Honeycombs		Chiral extended symmetry	Alternation honeycombs	
${\widehat{CR}}_3$ [(4,4,4,3)]	[(4,4,4,3)]	6	| | | | |	[(4,1^{+},4,1^{+},4,3^{+})]	(2)	↔
${\widehat{CR}}_3$ [(4,4,4,3)]	[2^{+}[(4,4,4,3)]]	3	| |	[2^{+}[(4,4^{+},4,3^{+})]]	(2)	|
${\widehat{CR}}_3$ [(4,4,4,3)]	[2^{+}[(4,4,4,3)]]	3	| |	[2^{+}[(4,4,4,3)]]^{+}	(1)	
${\widehat{RR}}_3$ [4^{[4]}]	[4^{[4]}]	(none)				
${\widehat{RR}}_3$ [4^{[4]}]	[2^{+}[4^{[4]}]]	1		[2^{+}[(4^{+},4)^{[2]}]]	(1)	
${\widehat{RR}}_3$ [4^{[4]}]	[1[4^{[4]}]]=[4,4^{1,1}] ↔	(2)		[(1^{+},4)^{[4]}]	(2)	↔
${\widehat{RR}}_3$ [4^{[4]}]	[2[4^{[4]}]]=[4,4,4] ↔	(1)		[2^{+}[(1^{+},4,4)^{[2]}]]	(1)	
${\widehat{RR}}_3$ [4^{[4]}]	[(2^{+},4)[4^{[4]}]]=[2^{+}[4,4,4]] =	(1)		[(2^{+},4)[4^{[4]}]]^{+} = [2^{+}[4,4,4]]^{+}	(1)	
${\widehat{AV}}_3$ [(6,3,3,3)]	[(6,3,3,3)]	6	| | | | |			
${\widehat{AV}}_3$ [(6,3,3,3)]	[2^{+}[(6,3,3,3)]]	3	| |	[2^{+}[(6,3,3,3)]]^{+}	(1)	
${\widehat{BV}}_3$ [(3,4,3,6)]	[(3,4,3,6)]	6	| | | | |	[(3^{+},4,3^{+},6)]	(1)	
${\widehat{BV}}_3$ [(3,4,3,6)]	[2^{+}[(3,4,3,6)]]	3	| |	[2^{+}[(3,4,3,6)]]^{+}	(1)	
${\widehat{HV}}_3$ [(3,5,3,6)]	[(3,5,3,6)]	6	| | | | |			
${\widehat{HV}}_3$ [(3,5,3,6)]	[2^{+}[(3,5,3,6)]]	3	| |	[2^{+}[(3,5,3,6)]]^{+}	(1)	
${\widehat{VV}}_3$ [(3,6)^{[2]}]	[(3,6)^{[2]}]	2	|			
${\widehat{VV}}_3$ [(3,6)^{[2]}]	[2^{+}[(3,6)^{[2]}]]	1				
${\widehat{VV}}_3$ [(3,6)^{[2]}]	[2^{+}[(3,6)^{[2]}]]	1				
${\widehat{VV}}_3$ [(3,6)^{[2]}]	[2^{+}[(3,6)^{[2]}]] =	(1)		[2^{+}[(3^{+},6)^{[2]}]]	(1)	
${\widehat{VV}}_3$ [(3,6)^{[2]}]	[(2,2)^{+}[(3,6)^{[2]}]]	1		[(2,2)^{+}[(3,6)^{[2]}]]^{+}	(1)	

Paracompact hyperbolic enumeration
Group	Extended symmetry	Honeycombs		Chiral extended symmetry	Alternation honeycombs	
${\widehat{BR}}_3$ [(3,3,4,4)]	[(3,3,4,4)]	4	| | |			
${\widehat{BR}}_3$ [(3,3,4,4)]	[1[(4,4,3,3)]]=[3,4^{1,1}] ↔	(7)	| | | | | |	[1[(3,3,4,1^{+},4)]]^{+} = [3^{+},4^{1,1}]^{+}	(2)	(=)
${\widehat{BR}}_3$ [(3,3,4,4)]	[1[(4,4,3,3)]]=[3,4^{1,1}] ↔	(7)	| | | | | |	[1[(3,3,4,4)]]^{+} = [3,4^{1,1}]^{+}	(1)	
${\bar{DP}}_3$ [3^{[ ]x[ ]}]	[3^{[ ]x[ ]}]	1				
${\bar{DP}}_3$ [3^{[ ]x[ ]}]	[1[3^{[ ]x[ ]}]]=[6,3^{1,1}] ↔	(2)	|			
${\bar{DP}}_3$ [3^{[ ]x[ ]}]	[1[3^{[ ]x[ ]}]]=[4,3^{[3]}] ↔	(2)	|			
${\bar{DP}}_3$ [3^{[ ]x[ ]}]	[2[3^{[ ]x[ ]}]]=[6,3,4] ↔	(3)	| |	[2[3^{[ ]x[ ]}]]^{+} =[6,3,4]^{+}	(1)	
${\bar{PP}}_3$ [3^{[3,3]}]	[3^{[3,3]}]	0	(none)			
${\bar{PP}}_3$ [3^{[3,3]}]	[1[3^{[3,3]}]]=[6,3^{[3]}] ↔	0	(none)			
${\bar{PP}}_3$ [3^{[3,3]}]	[3[3^{[3,3]}]]=[3,6,3] ↔	(2)	|			
${\bar{PP}}_3$ [3^{[3,3]}]	[2[3^{[3,3]}]]=[6,3,6] ↔	(1)				
${\bar{PP}}_3$ [3^{[3,3]}]	[(3,3)[3^{[3,3]}]]=[6,3,3] =	(1)		[(3,3)[3^{[3,3]}]]^{+} = [6,3,3]^{+}	(1)	

=== Loop-n-tail graphs ===
Symmetry in these graphs can be doubled by adding a mirror: [1[n,3^{[3]}]] = [n,3,6]. Therefore ring-symmetry graphs are repeated in the linear graph families.

Paracompact hyperbolic enumeration
Group	Extended symmetry	Honeycombs		Chiral extended symmetry	Alternation honeycombs	
${\bar{P}}_3$ [3,3^{[3]}]	[3,3^{[3]}]	4	| | |			
${\bar{P}}_3$ [3,3^{[3]}]	[1[3,3^{[3]}]]=[3,3,6] ↔	(7)	| | | | | |	[1[3,3^{[3]}]]^{+} = [3,3,6]^{+}	(1)	
${\bar{BP}}_3$ [4,3^{[3]}]	[4,3^{[3]}]	4	| | |			
${\bar{BP}}_3$ [4,3^{[3]}]	[1[4,3^{[3]}]]=[4,3,6] ↔	(7)	| | | | | |	[1^{+},4,(3^{[3]})^{+}]	(2)	↔
${\bar{BP}}_3$ [4,3^{[3]}]	[1[4,3^{[3]}]]=[4,3,6] ↔	(7)	| | | | | |	[4,3^{[3]}]^{+}	(1)	
${\bar{HP}}_3$ [5,3^{[3]}]	[5,3^{[3]}]	4	| | |			
${\bar{HP}}_3$ [5,3^{[3]}]	[1[5,3^{[3]}]]=[5,3,6] ↔	(7)	| | | | | |	[1[5,3^{[3]}]]^{+} = [5,3,6]^{+}	(1)	
${\bar{VP}}_3$ [6,3^{[3]}]	[6,3^{[3]}]	2	|			
${\bar{VP}}_3$ [6,3^{[3]}]	[6,3^{[3]}] =	(2)	( ↔) | ( =)			
${\bar{VP}}_3$ [6,3^{[3]}]	[(3,3)[1^{+},6,3^{[3]}]]=[6,3,3] ↔ ↔	(1)		[(3,3)[1^{+},6,3^{[3]}]]^{+}	(1)	
${\bar{VP}}_3$ [6,3^{[3]}]	[1[6,3^{[3]}]]=[6,3,6] ↔	(6)	| | | | |	[3[1^{+},6,3^{[3]}]]^{+} = [3,6,3]^{+}	(1)	↔ (= )
${\bar{VP}}_3$ [6,3^{[3]}]	[1[6,3^{[3]}]]=[6,3,6] ↔	(6)	| | | | |	[1[6,3^{[3]}]]^{+} = [6,3,6]^{+}	(1)	

== See also ==
- Uniform tilings in hyperbolic plane
- List of regular polytopes#Tessellations of hyperbolic 3-space
- Uniform honeycombs in hyperbolic space
