= Circumscribed sphere =

Sphere touching all of a polyhedron's vertices

Circumscribed sphere of a cube

In geometry, a circumscribed sphere of a polyhedron is a sphere that contains the polyhedron and touches each of the polyhedron's vertices. The word circumsphere is sometimes used to mean the same thing, by analogy with the term circumcircle. As in the case of two-dimensional circumscribed circles (circumcircles), the radius of a sphere circumscribed around a polyhedron P is called the circumradius of P, and the center point of this sphere is called the circumcenter of P.

== Existence and optimality ==
When it exists, a circumscribed sphere need not be the smallest sphere containing the polyhedron; for instance, the tetrahedron formed by a vertex of a cube and its three neighbors has the same circumsphere as the cube itself, but can be contained within a smaller sphere having the three neighboring vertices on its equator. However, the smallest sphere containing a given polyhedron is always the circumsphere of the convex hull of a subset of the vertices of the polyhedron.

In De solidorum elementis (circa 1630), René Descartes observed that, for a polyhedron with a circumscribed sphere, all faces have circumscribed circles, the circles where the plane of the face meets the circumscribed sphere. Descartes suggested that this necessary condition for the existence of a circumscribed sphere is sufficient, but it is not true: some bipyramids, for instance, can have circumscribed circles for their faces (all of which are triangles) but still have no circumscribed sphere for the whole polyhedron. However, whenever a simple polyhedron has a circumscribed circle for each of its faces, it also has a circumscribed sphere.

== Related concepts ==
The circumscribed sphere is the three-dimensional analogue of the circumscribed circle. All regular polyhedra have circumscribed spheres, but most irregular polyhedra do not have one, since in general not all vertices lie on a common sphere. The circumscribed sphere (when it exists) is an example of a bounding sphere, a sphere that contains a given shape. It is possible to define the smallest bounding sphere for any polyhedron, and compute it in linear time.

Other spheres defined for some but not all polyhedra include a midsphere, a sphere tangent to all edges of a polyhedron, and an inscribed sphere, a sphere tangent to all faces of a polyhedron. In the regular polyhedra, the inscribed sphere, midsphere, and circumscribed sphere all exist and are concentric.

When the circumscribed sphere is the set of infinite limiting points of hyperbolic space, a polyhedron that it circumscribes is known as an ideal polyhedron.

== Point on the circumscribed sphere ==
There are five convex regular polyhedra, known as the Platonic solids. All Platonic solids have circumscribed spheres. For an arbitrary point $M$ on the circumscribed sphere of each Platonic solid with number of the vertices $n$, if $MA_i$ are the distances to the vertices $A_i$, then

$$4(MA_1^{2}+MA_2^{2}+...+MA_n^{2})^2=3n(MA_1^{4}+MA_2^{4}+...+MA_n^{4}).$$
