= Order-4 hexagonal tiling honeycomb =

Order-4 hexagonal tiling honeycomb
Perspective projection view within Poincaré disk model
Type	Hyperbolic regular honeycomb Paracompact uniform honeycomb
Schläfli symbols	{6,3,4} {6,3^{1,1}} t_{0,1}{(3,6)^{2}}
Coxeter diagrams	↔ ↔ ↔
Cells	{6,3}
Faces	hexagon {6}
Edge figure	square {4}
Vertex figure	octahedron
Dual	Order-6 cubic honeycomb
Coxeter groups	$\overline{BV}_3$, [4,3,6] $\overline{DV}_3$, [6,3^{1,1}] $\widehat{VV}_3$, [(6,3)^{[2]}]
Properties	Regular, quasiregular

In the field of hyperbolic geometry, the order-4 hexagonal tiling honeycomb arises as one of 11 regular paracompact honeycombs in 3-dimensional hyperbolic space. It is paracompact because it has cells composed of an infinite number of faces. Each cell is a hexagonal tiling whose vertices lie on a horosphere: a flat plane in hyperbolic space that approaches a single ideal point at infinity.

A geometric honeycomb is a space-filling of polyhedral or higher-dimensional cells, so that there are no gaps. It is an example of the more general mathematical tiling or tessellation in any number of dimensions.

Honeycombs are usually constructed in ordinary Euclidean ("flat") space, like the convex uniform honeycombs. They may also be constructed in non-Euclidean spaces, such as hyperbolic uniform honeycombs. Any finite uniform polytope can be projected to its circumsphere to form a uniform honeycomb in spherical space.

The Schläfli symbol of the order-4 hexagonal tiling honeycomb is {6,3,4}. Since that of the hexagonal tiling is {6,3}, this honeycomb has four such hexagonal tilings meeting at each edge. Since the Schläfli symbol of the octahedron is {3,4}, the vertex figure of this honeycomb is an octahedron. Thus, eight hexagonal tilings meet at each vertex of this honeycomb, and the six edges meeting at each vertex lie along three orthogonal axes.

== Images ==
Perspective projection	One cell, viewed from outside the Poincare sphere
The vertices of a t{(3,∞,3)}, tiling exist as a 2-hypercycle within this honeycomb	The honeycomb is analogous to the H^{2} order-4 apeirogonal tiling, {∞,4}, shown here with one green apeirogon outlined by its horocycle

== Symmetry ==
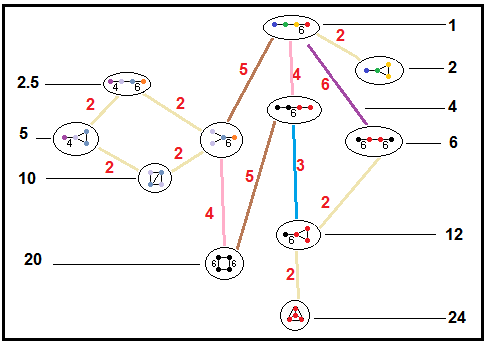
Subgroup relations

The order-4 hexagonal tiling honeycomb has three reflective simplex symmetry constructions.

The half-symmetry uniform construction {6,3^{1,1}} has two types (colors) of hexagonal tilings, with Coxeter diagram ↔. A quarter-symmetry construction also exists, with four colors of hexagonal tilings:.

An additional two reflective symmetries exist with non-simplectic fundamental domains: [6,3^{*},4], which is index 6, with Coxeter diagram; and [6,(3,4)^{*}], which is index 48. The latter has a cubic fundamental domain, and an octahedral Coxeter diagram with three axial infinite branches: . It can be seen as using eight colors to color the hexagonal tilings of the honeycomb.

The order-4 hexagonal tiling honeycomb contains, which tile 2-hypercycle surfaces and are similar to the truncated infinite-order triangular tiling,:

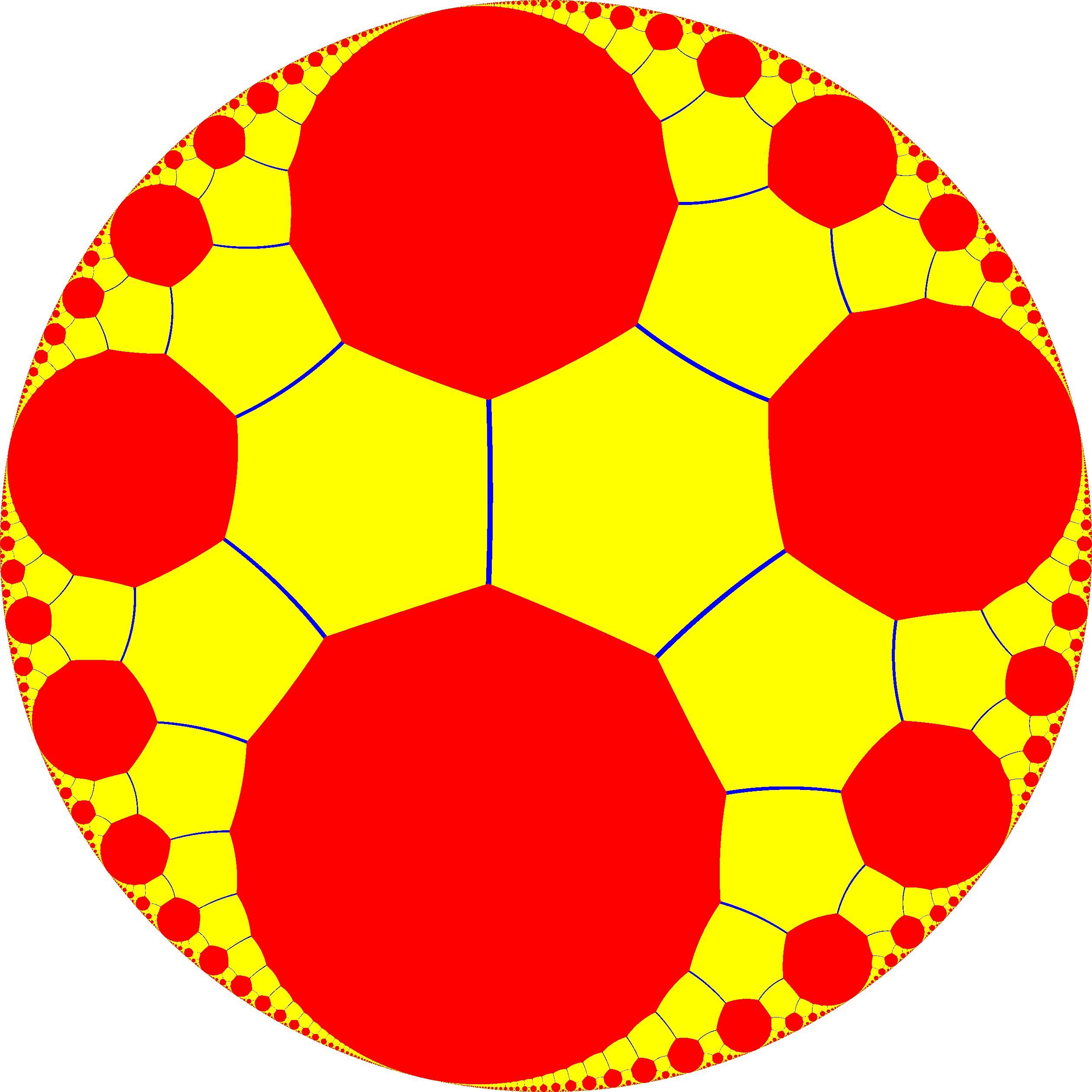

== Related polytopes and honeycombs ==
The order-4 hexagonal tiling honeycomb is a regular hyperbolic honeycomb in 3-space, and one of 11 which are paracompact.

11 paracompact regular honeycombs
{6,3,3}	{6,3,4}	{6,3,5}	{6,3,6}	{4,4,3}	{4,4,4}
{3,3,6}	{4,3,6}	{5,3,6}	{3,6,3}	{3,4,4}	

There are fifteen uniform honeycombs in the [6,3,4] Coxeter group family, including this regular form, and its dual, the order-6 cubic honeycomb.

[6,3,4] family honeycombs
{6,3,4}	r{6,3,4}	t{6,3,4}	rr{6,3,4}	t_{0,3}{6,3,4}	tr{6,3,4}	t_{0,1,3}{6,3,4}	t_{0,1,2,3}{6,3,4}
{4,3,6}	r{4,3,6}	t{4,3,6}	rr{4,3,6}	2t{4,3,6}	tr{4,3,6}	t_{0,1,3}{4,3,6}	t_{0,1,2,3}{4,3,6}

The order-4 hexagonal tiling honeycomb has a related alternated honeycomb, ↔, with triangular tiling and octahedron cells.

It is a part of sequence of regular honeycombs of the form {6,3,p}, all of which are composed of hexagonal tiling cells:

{6,3,p} honeycombs
Space	H^{3}						
Form	Paracompact				Noncompact		
Name	{6,3,3}	{6,3,4}	{6,3,5}	{6,3,6}	{6,3,7}	{6,3,8}	... {6,3,∞}
Coxeter							
Image							
Vertex figure {3,p}	{3,3}	{3,4}	{3,5}	{3,6}	{3,7}	{3,8}	{3,∞}

This honeycomb is also related to the 16-cell, cubic honeycomb and order-4 dodecahedral honeycomb, all of which have octahedral vertex figures.

{p,3,4} regular honeycombs
Space	S^{3}	E^{3}	H^{3}				
Form	Finite	Affine	Compact	Paracompact	Noncompact		
Name	{3,3,4}	{4,3,4}	{5,3,4}	{6,3,4}	{7,3,4}	{8,3,4}	... {∞,3,4}
Image							
Cells	{3,3}	{4,3}	{5,3}	{6,3}	{7,3}	{8,3}	{∞,3}

The aforementioned honeycombs are also quasiregular:

Regular and quasiregular honeycombs: {p,3,4} and {p,3^{1,1}}
Space	Euclidean 4-space	Euclidean 3-space	Hyperbolic 3-space	
Name	{3,3,4} {3,3^{1,1}} = $\left\{3,{3\atop3}\right\}$	{4,3,4} {4,3^{1,1}} = $\left\{4,{3\atop3}\right\}$	{5,3,4} {5,3^{1,1}} = $\left\{5,{3\atop3}\right\}$	{6,3,4} {6,3^{1,1}} = $\left\{6,{3\atop3}\right\}$
Coxeter diagram	=	=	=	=
Image				
Cells {p,3}				

=== Rectified order-4 hexagonal tiling honeycomb ===
Rectified order-4 hexagonal tiling honeycomb
Type	Paracompact uniform honeycomb
Schläfli symbols	r{6,3,4} or t_{1}{6,3,4}
Coxeter diagrams	↔ ↔ ↔
Cells	{3,4} r{6,3}
Faces	triangle {3} hexagon {6}
Vertex figure	square prism
Coxeter groups	$\overline{BV}_3$, [4,3,6] $\overline{BP}_3$, [4,3^{[3]}] $\overline{DV}_3$, [6,3^{1,1}] $\overline{DP}_3$, [3^{[]×[]}]
Properties	Vertex-transitive, edge-transitive

The rectified order-4 hexagonal tiling honeycomb, t_{1}{6,3,4}, has octahedral and trihexagonal tiling facets, with a square prism vertex figure.

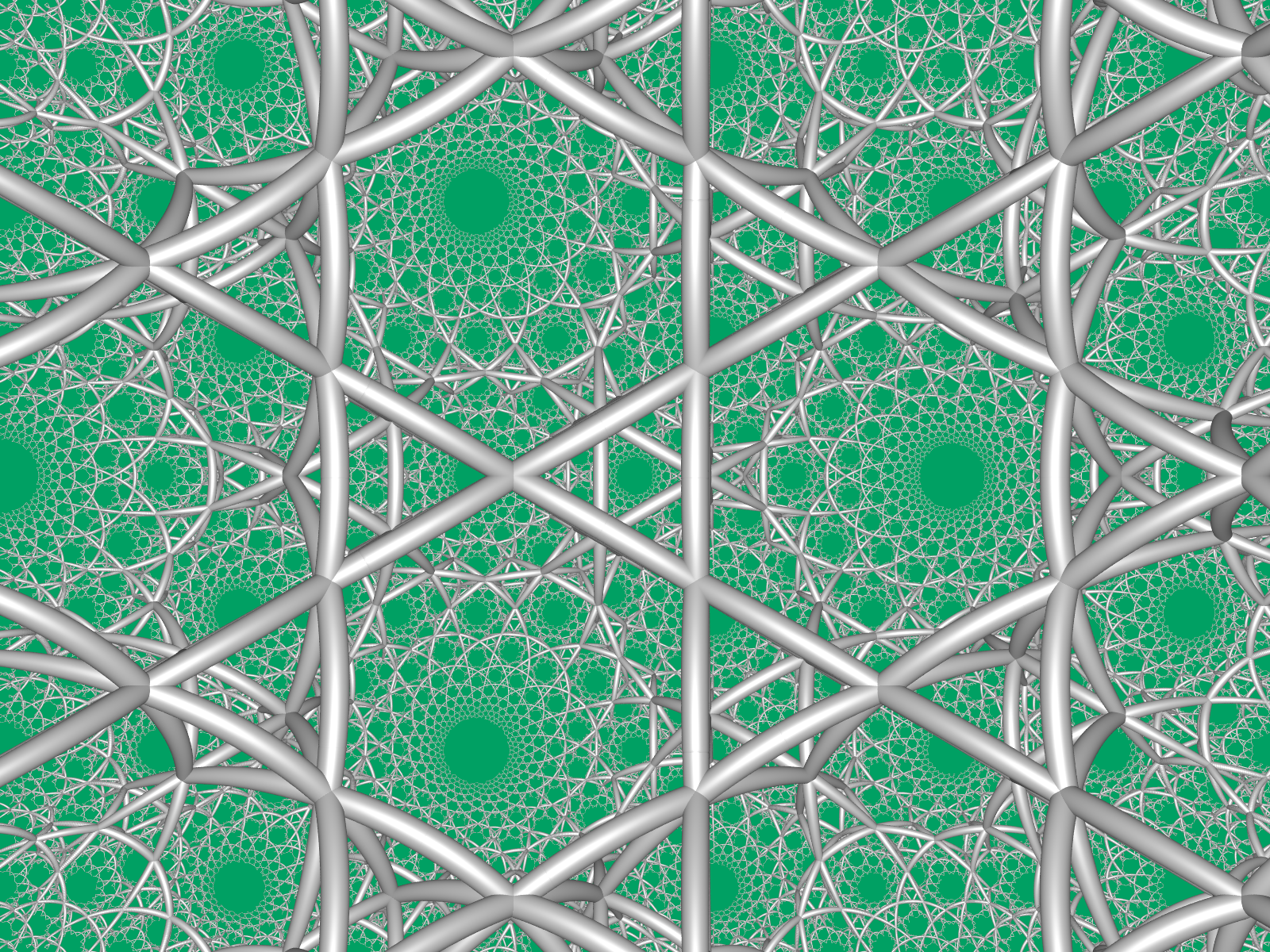

It is similar to the 2D hyperbolic tetraapeirogonal tiling, r{∞,4}, which alternates apeirogonal and square faces:

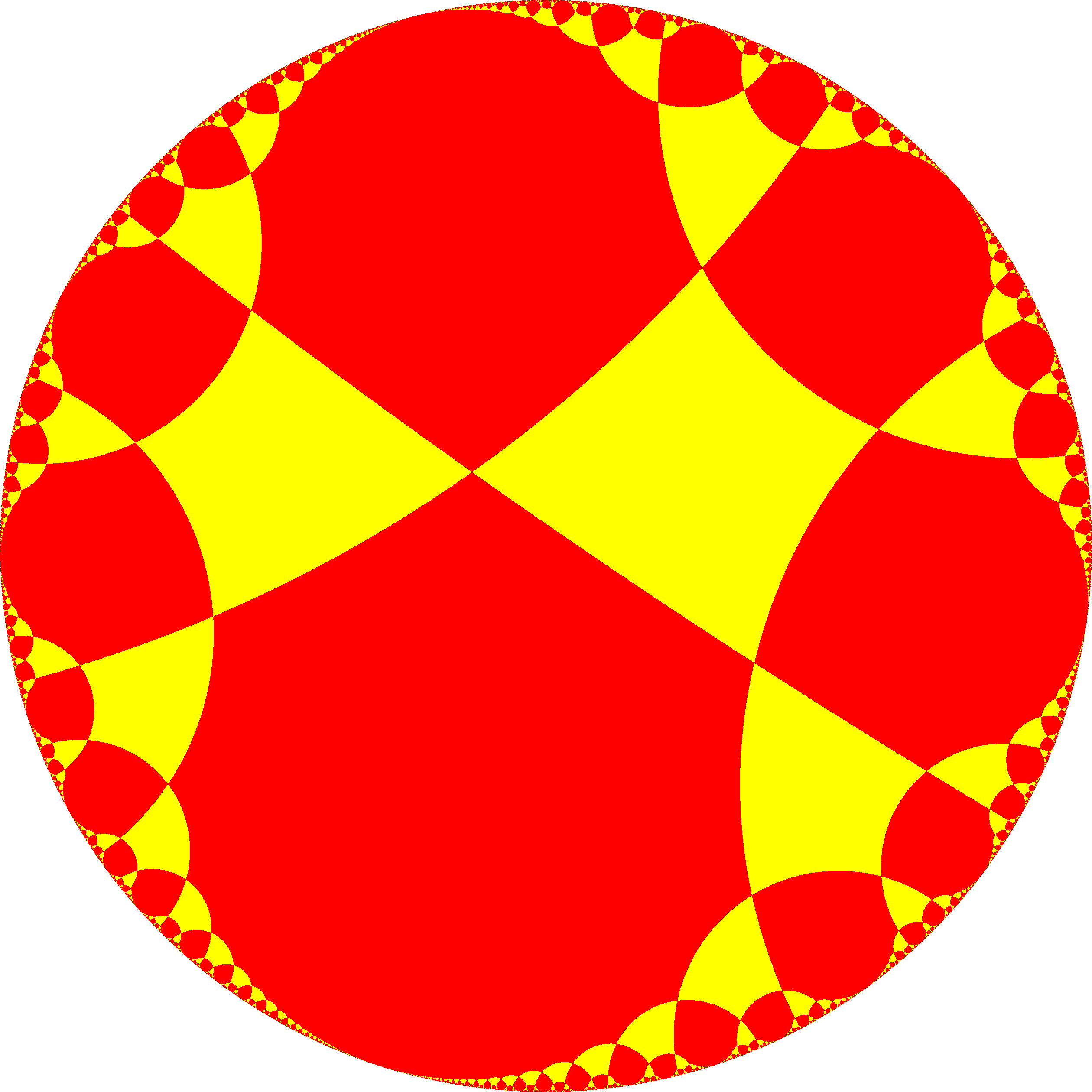

=== Truncated order-4 hexagonal tiling honeycomb ===
Truncated order-4 hexagonal tiling honeycomb
Type	Paracompact uniform honeycomb
Schläfli symbol	t{6,3,4} or t_{0,1}{6,3,4}
Coxeter diagram	↔
Cells	{3,4} t{6,3}
Faces	triangle {3} dodecagon {12}
Vertex figure	square pyramid
Coxeter groups	$\overline{BV}_3$, [4,3,6] $\overline{DV}_3$, [6,3^{1,1}]
Properties	Vertex-transitive

The truncated order-4 hexagonal tiling honeycomb, t_{0,1}{6,3,4}, has octahedron and truncated hexagonal tiling facets, with a square pyramid vertex figure.

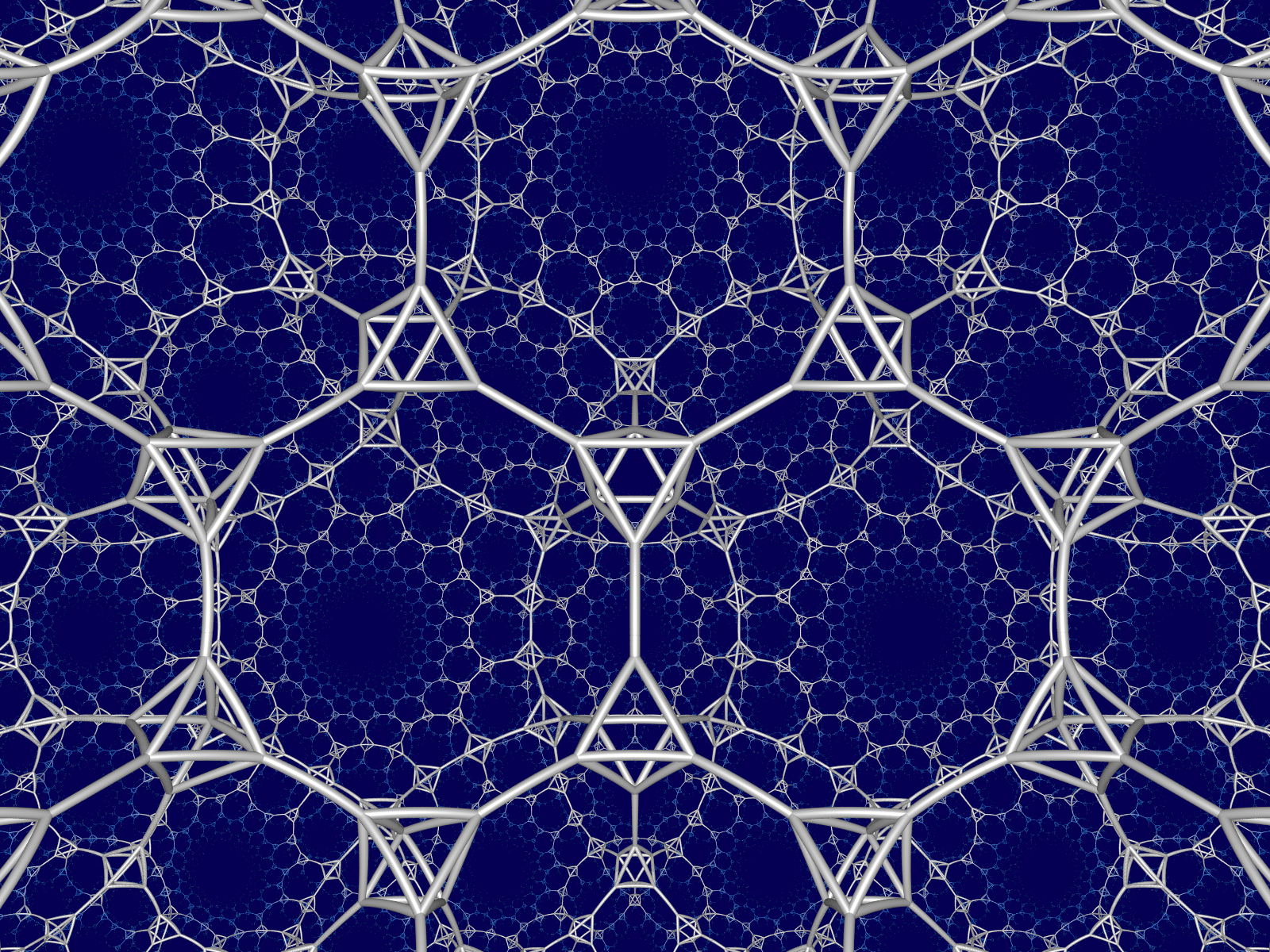

It is similar to the 2D hyperbolic truncated order-4 apeirogonal tiling, t{∞,4}, with apeirogonal and square faces:

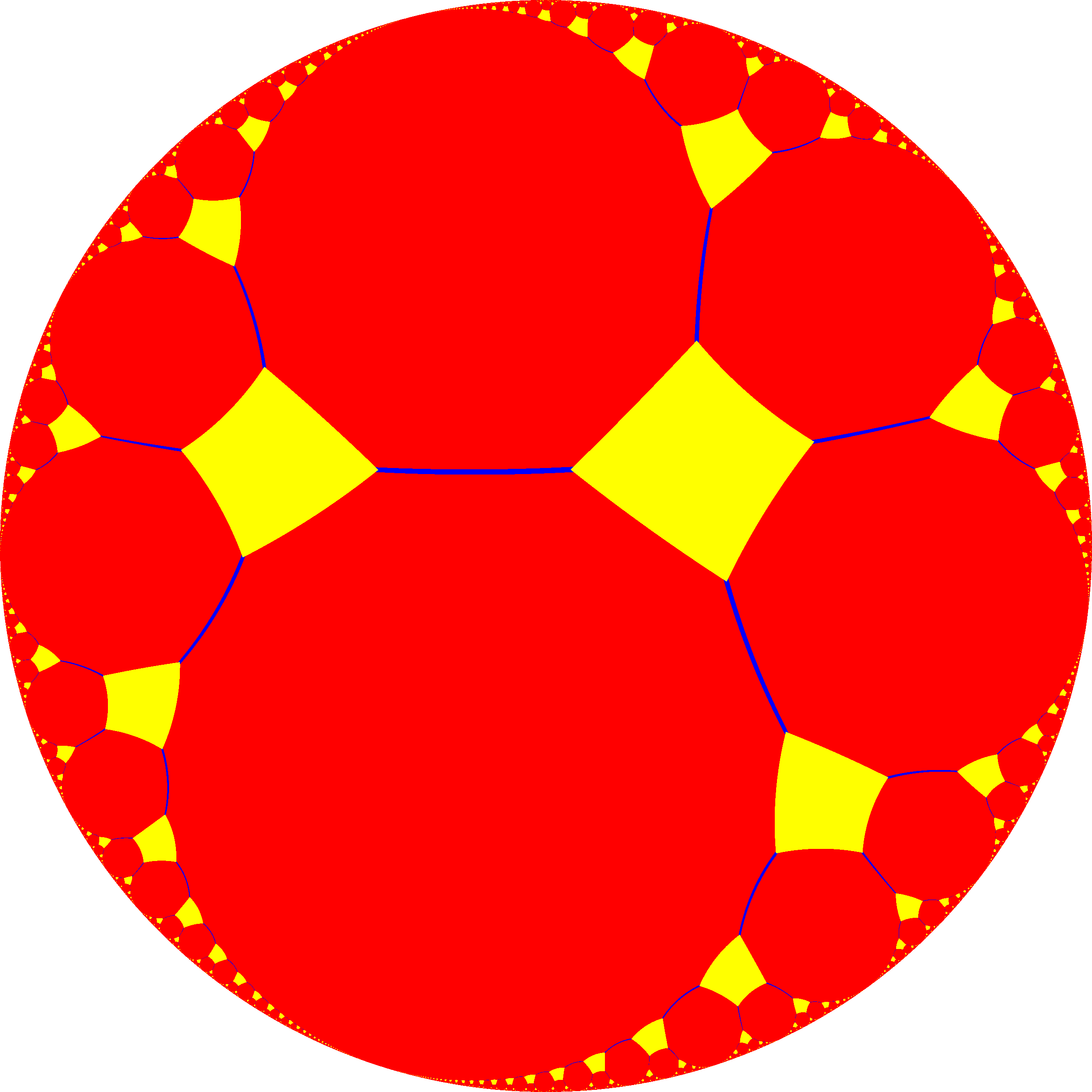

=== Bitruncated order-4 hexagonal tiling honeycomb ===
Bitruncated order-4 hexagonal tiling honeycomb
Type	Paracompact uniform honeycomb
Schläfli symbol	2t{6,3,4} or t_{1,2}{6,3,4}
Coxeter diagram	↔ ↔ ↔
Cells	t{4,3} t{3,6}
Faces	square {4} hexagon {6}
Vertex figure	digonal disphenoid
Coxeter groups	$\overline{BV}_3$, [4,3,6] $\overline{BP}_3$, [4,3^{[3]}] $\overline{DV}_3$, [6,3^{1,1}] $\overline{DP}_3$, [3^{[]×[]}]
Properties	Vertex-transitive

The bitruncated order-4 hexagonal tiling honeycomb, t_{1,2}{6,3,4}, has truncated octahedron and hexagonal tiling cells, with a digonal disphenoid vertex figure.

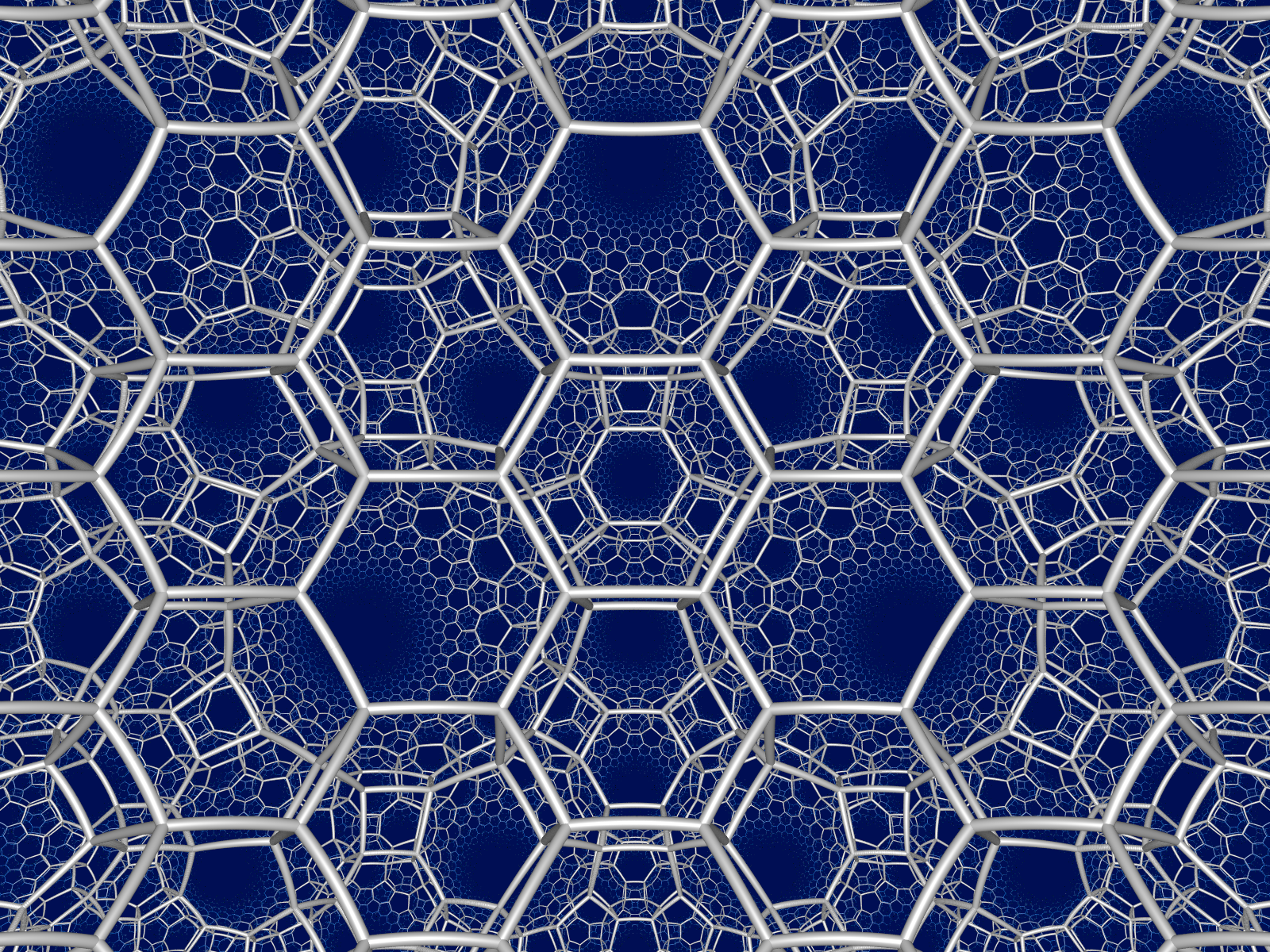

=== Cantellated order-4 hexagonal tiling honeycomb ===
Cantellated order-4 hexagonal tiling honeycomb
Type	Paracompact uniform honeycomb
Schläfli symbol	rr{6,3,4} or t_{0,2}{6,3,4}
Coxeter diagram	↔
Cells	r{3,4} {}x{4} rr{6,3}
Faces	triangle {3} square {4} hexagon {6}
Vertex figure	wedge
Coxeter groups	$\overline{BV}_3$, [4,3,6] $\overline{DV}_3$, [6,3^{1,1}]
Properties	Vertex-transitive

The cantellated order-4 hexagonal tiling honeycomb, t_{0,2}{6,3,4}, has cuboctahedron, cube, and rhombitrihexagonal tiling cells, with a wedge vertex figure.

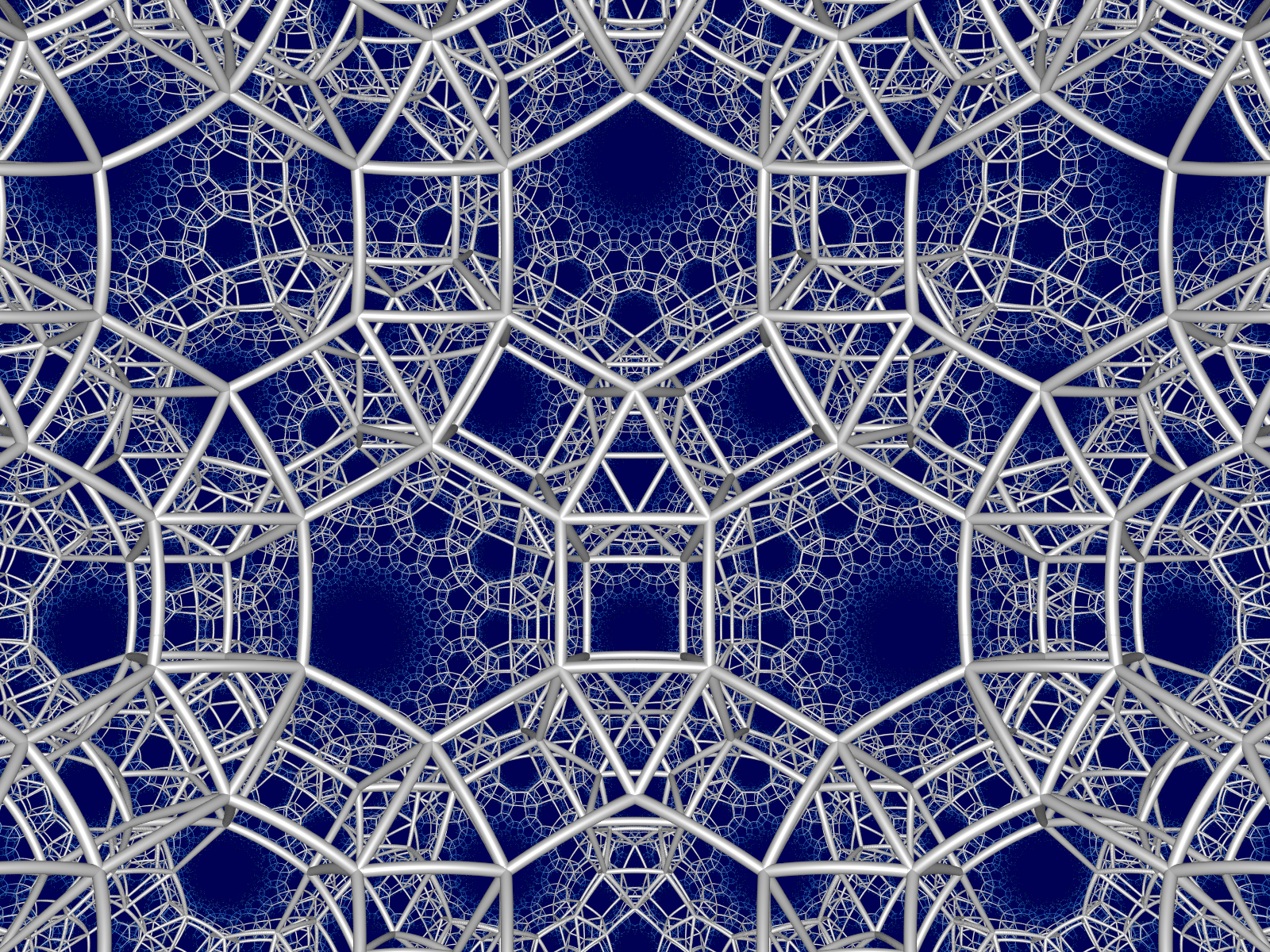

=== Cantitruncated order-4 hexagonal tiling honeycomb ===
Cantitruncated order-4 hexagonal tiling honeycomb
Type	Paracompact uniform honeycomb
Schläfli symbol	tr{6,3,4} or t_{0,1,2}{6,3,4}
Coxeter diagram	↔
Cells	t{3,4} {}x{4} tr{6,3}
Faces	square {4} hexagon {6} dodecagon {12}
Vertex figure	mirrored sphenoid
Coxeter groups	$\overline{BV}_3$, [4,3,6] $\overline{DV}_3$, [6,3^{1,1}]
Properties	Vertex-transitive

The cantitruncated order-4 hexagonal tiling honeycomb, t_{0,1,2}{6,3,4}, has truncated octahedron, cube, and truncated trihexagonal tiling cells, with a mirrored sphenoid vertex figure.

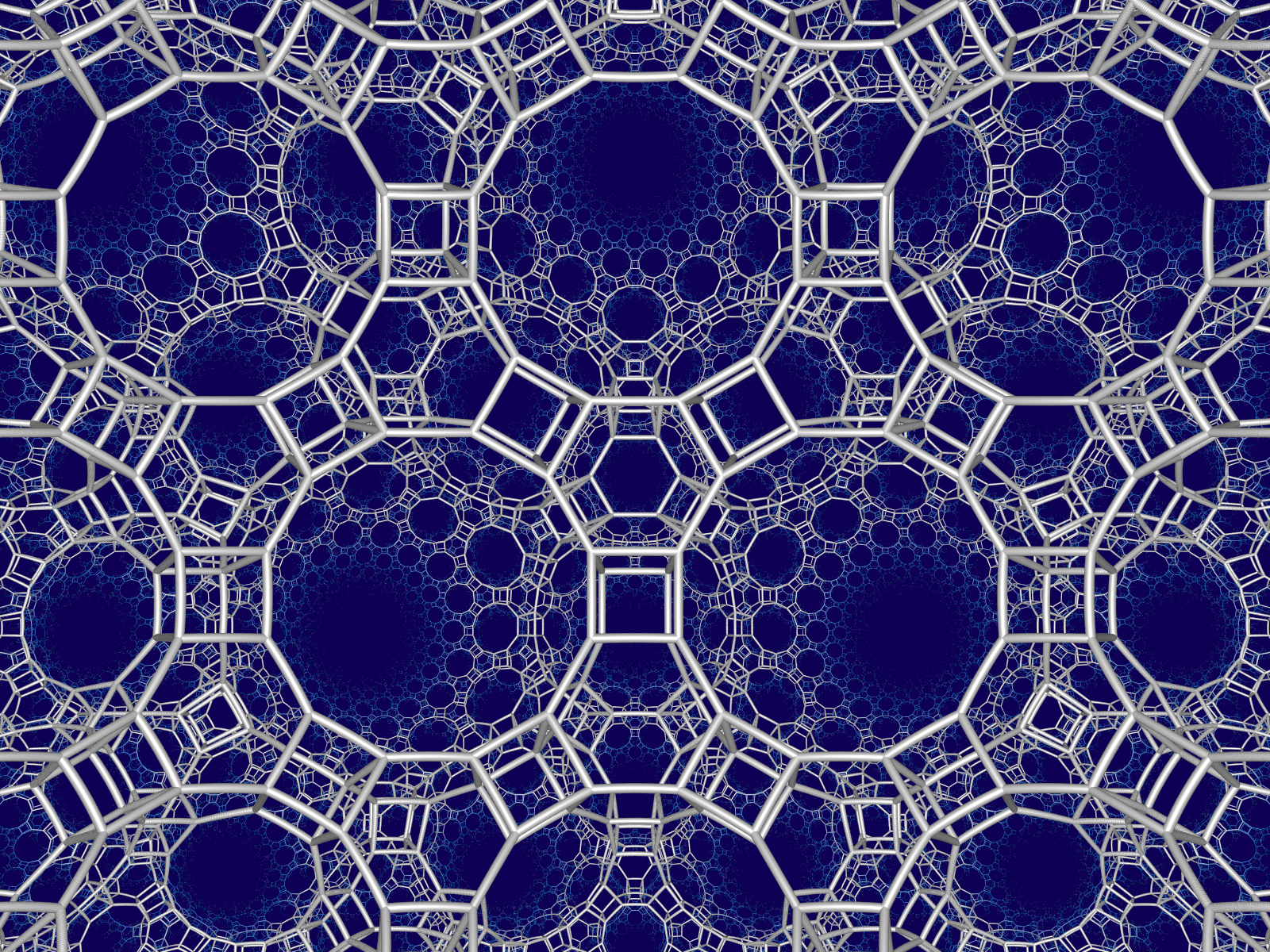

=== Runcinated order-4 hexagonal tiling honeycomb ===
Runcinated order-4 hexagonal tiling honeycomb
Type	Paracompact uniform honeycomb
Schläfli symbol	t_{0,3}{6,3,4}
Coxeter diagram	↔
Cells	{4,3} {}x{4} {6,3} {}x{6}
Faces	square {4} hexagon {6}
Vertex figure	irregular triangular antiprism
Coxeter groups	$\overline{BV}_3$, [4,3,6]
Properties	Vertex-transitive

The runcinated order-4 hexagonal tiling honeycomb, t_{0,3}{6,3,4}, has cube, hexagonal tiling and hexagonal prism cells, with an irregular triangular antiprism vertex figure.

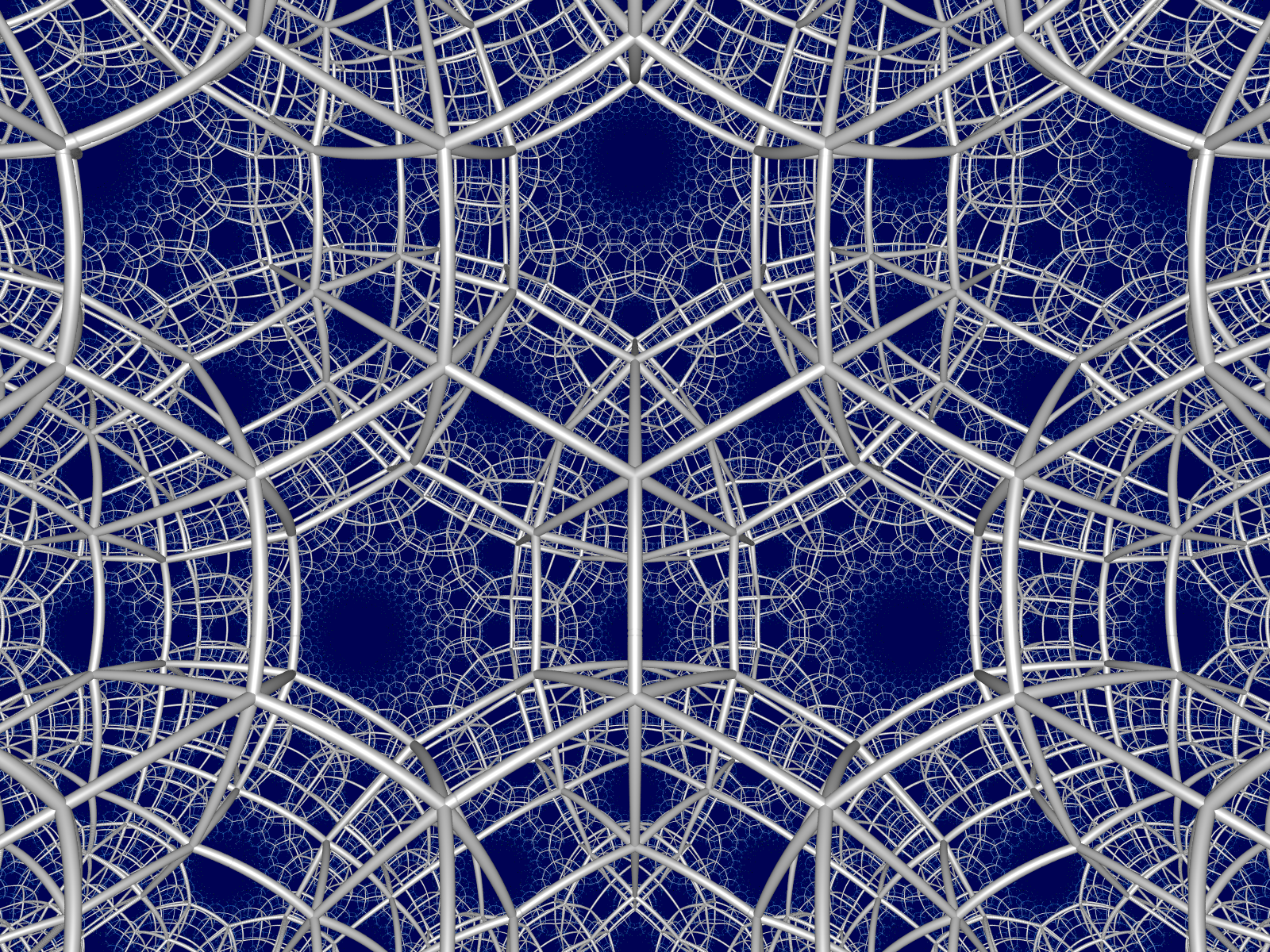

It contains the 2D hyperbolic rhombitetrahexagonal tiling, rr{4,6}, with square and hexagonal faces. The tiling also has a half symmetry construction.

=

=== Runcitruncated order-4 hexagonal tiling honeycomb ===
Runcitruncated order-4 hexagonal tiling honeycomb
Type	Paracompact uniform honeycomb
Schläfli symbol	t_{0,1,3}{6,3,4}
Coxeter diagram	
Cells	rr{3,4} {}x{4} {}x{12} t{6,3}
Faces	triangle {3} square {4} dodecagon {12}
Vertex figure	isosceles-trapezoidal pyramid
Coxeter groups	$\overline{BV}_3$, [4,3,6]
Properties	Vertex-transitive

The runcitruncated order-4 hexagonal tiling honeycomb, t_{0,1,3}{6,3,4}, has rhombicuboctahedron, cube, dodecagonal prism, and truncated hexagonal tiling cells, with an isosceles-trapezoidal pyramid vertex figure.

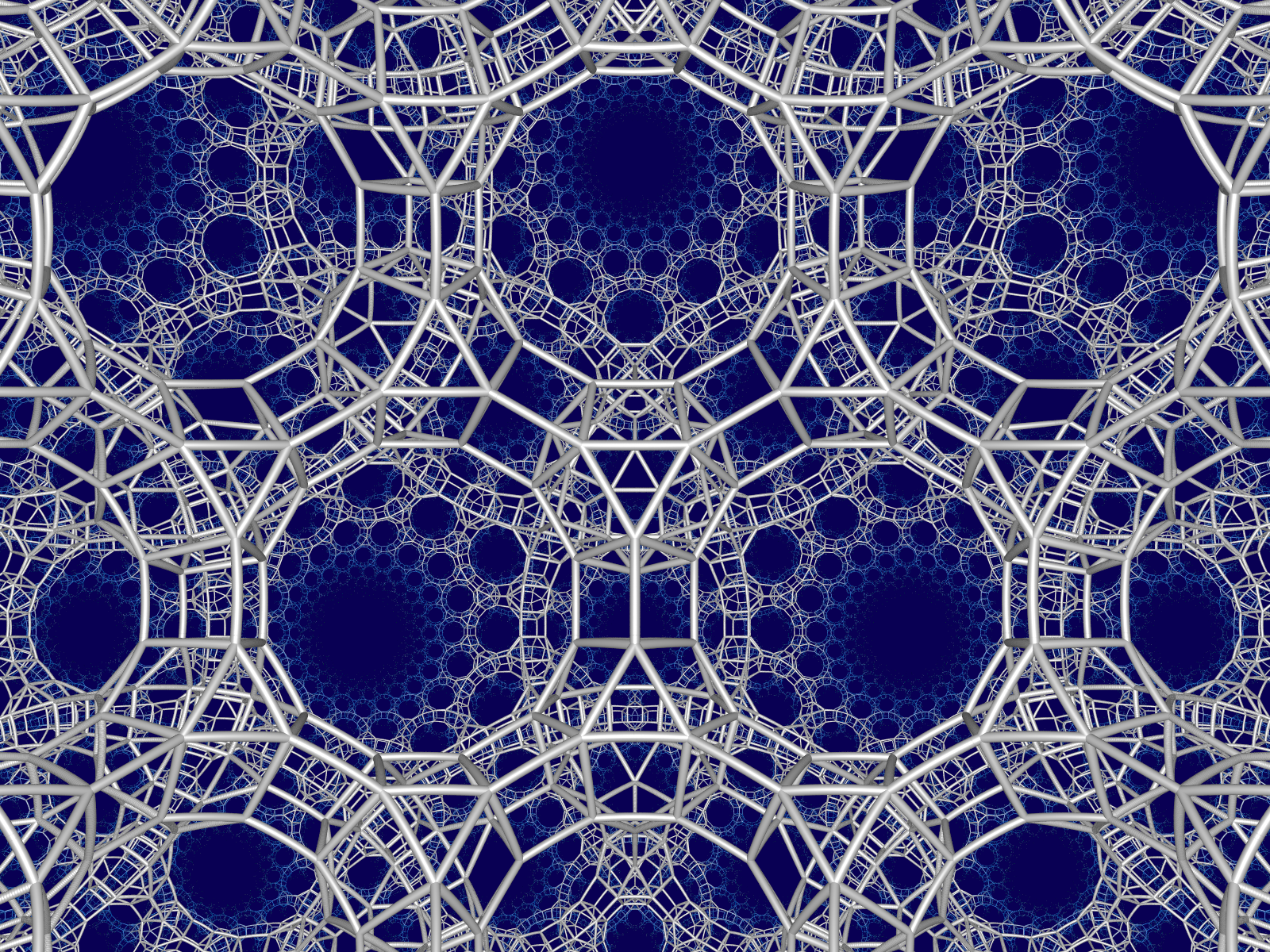

=== Runcicantellated order-4 hexagonal tiling honeycomb ===
The runcicantellated order-4 hexagonal tiling honeycomb is the same as the runcitruncated order-6 cubic honeycomb.

=== Omnitruncated order-4 hexagonal tiling honeycomb ===
Omnitruncated order-4 hexagonal tiling honeycomb
Type	Paracompact uniform honeycomb
Schläfli symbol	t_{0,1,2,3}{6,3,4}
Coxeter diagram	
Cells	tr{4,3} tr{6,3} {}x{12} {}x{8}
Faces	square {4} hexagon {6} octagon {8} dodecagon {12}
Vertex figure	irregular tetrahedron
Coxeter groups	$\overline{BV}_3$, [4,3,6]
Properties	Vertex-transitive

The omnitruncated order-4 hexagonal tiling honeycomb, t_{0,1,2,3}{6,3,4}, has truncated cuboctahedron, truncated trihexagonal tiling, dodecagonal prism, and octagonal prism cells, with an irregular tetrahedron vertex figure.

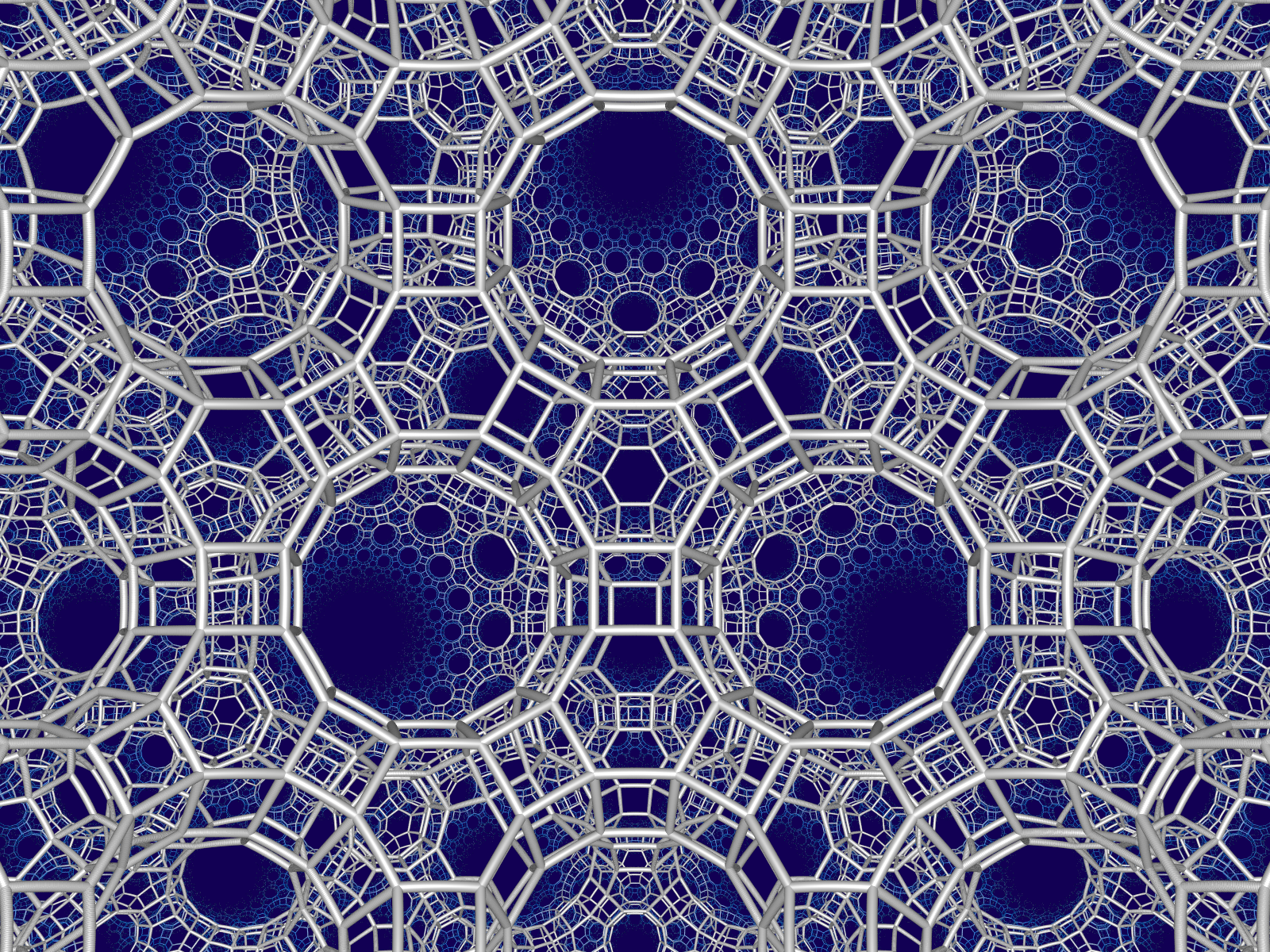

=== Alternated order-4 hexagonal tiling honeycomb ===
Alternated order-4 hexagonal tiling honeycomb
Type	Paracompact uniform honeycomb Semiregular honeycomb
Schläfli symbols	h{6,3,4}
Coxeter diagrams	↔
Cells	{3^{[3]}} {3,4}
Faces	triangle {3}
Vertex figure	truncated octahedron
Coxeter groups	$\overline{BP}_3$, [4,3^{[3]}]
Properties	Vertex-transitive, edge-transitive, quasiregular

The alternated order-4 hexagonal tiling honeycomb, ↔, is composed of triangular tiling and octahedron cells, in a truncated octahedron vertex figure.

=== Cantic order-4 hexagonal tiling honeycomb ===
Cantic order-4 hexagonal tiling honeycomb
Type	Paracompact uniform honeycomb
Schläfli symbols	h_{2}{6,3,4}
Coxeter diagrams	↔
Cells	h_{2}{6,3} t{3,4} r{3,4}
Faces	triangle {3} square {4} hexagon {6}
Vertex figure	wedge
Coxeter groups	$\overline{BP}_3$, [4,3^{[3]}]
Properties	Vertex-transitive

The cantic order-4 hexagonal tiling honeycomb, ↔, is composed of trihexagonal tiling, truncated octahedron, and cuboctahedron cells, with a wedge vertex figure.

=== Runcic order-4 hexagonal tiling honeycomb ===
Runcic order-4 hexagonal tiling honeycomb
Type	Paracompact uniform honeycomb
Schläfli symbols	h_{3}{6,3,4}
Coxeter diagrams	↔
Cells	{3^{[3]}} rr{3,4} {4,3} {}x{3}
Faces	triangle {3} square {4}
Vertex figure	triangular cupola
Coxeter groups	$\overline{BP}_3$, [4,3^{[3]}]
Properties	Vertex-transitive

The runcic order-4 hexagonal tiling honeycomb, ↔, is composed of triangular tiling, rhombicuboctahedron, cube, and triangular prism cells, with a triangular cupola vertex figure.

=== Runcicantic order-4 hexagonal tiling honeycomb ===
Runcicantic order-4 hexagonal tiling honeycomb
Type	Paracompact uniform honeycomb
Schläfli symbols	h_{2,3}{6,3,4}
Coxeter diagrams	↔
Cells	h_{2}{6,3} tr{3,4} t{4,3} {}x{3}
Faces	triangle {3} square {4} hexagon {6} octagon {8}
Vertex figure	rectangular pyramid
Coxeter groups	$\overline{BP}_3$, [4,3^{[3]}]
Properties	Vertex-transitive

The runcicantic order-4 hexagonal tiling honeycomb, ↔, is composed of trihexagonal tiling, truncated cuboctahedron, truncated cube, and triangular prism cells, with a rectangular pyramid vertex figure.

=== Quarter order-4 hexagonal tiling honeycomb ===
Quarter order-4 hexagonal tiling honeycomb
Type	Paracompact uniform honeycomb
Schläfli symbol	q{6,3,4}
Coxeter diagram	↔
Cells	{3^{[3]}} {3,3} t{3,3} h_{2}{6,3}
Faces	triangle {3} hexagon {6}
Vertex figure	triangular cupola
Coxeter groups	$\overline{DP}_3$, [3^{[]x[]}]
Properties	Vertex-transitive

The quarter order-4 hexagonal tiling honeycomb, q{6,3,4}, or, is composed of triangular tiling, trihexagonal tiling, tetrahedron, and truncated tetrahedron cells, with a triangular cupola vertex figure.

== See also ==
- Convex uniform honeycombs in hyperbolic space
- Regular tessellations of hyperbolic 3-space
- Paracompact uniform honeycombs
