= Order-4 dodecahedral honeycomb =

Regular tiling of hyperbolic 3-space

Order-4 dodecahedral honeycomb
Type	Hyperbolic regular honeycomb Uniform hyperbolic honeycomb
Schläfli symbol	{5,3,4} {5,3^{1,1}}
Coxeter diagram	↔
Cells	{5,3} (dodecahedron)
Faces	{5} (pentagon)
Edge figure	{4} (square)
Vertex figure	octahedron
Dual	Order-5 cubic honeycomb
Coxeter group	$\overline{BH_3}$, [4,3,5] $\overline{DH_3}$, [5,3^{1,1}]
Properties	Regular, Quasiregular honeycomb

In hyperbolic geometry, the order-4 dodecahedral honeycomb is one of four compact regular space-filling tessellations (or honeycombs) of hyperbolic 3-space. With Schläfli symbol {5,3,4}, it has four dodecahedra around each edge, and 8 dodecahedra around each vertex in an octahedral arrangement. Its vertices are constructed from 3 orthogonal axes. Its dual is the order-5 cubic honeycomb. The order-4 dodecahedral honeycomb has the lowest sectional curvature relative to cell edge length of the regular hyperbolic tessellations in 3-space.

A geometric honeycomb is a space-filling of polyhedral or higher-dimensional cells, so that there are no gaps. It is an example of the more general mathematical tiling or tessellation in any number of dimensions.

Honeycombs are usually constructed in ordinary Euclidean ("flat") space, like the convex uniform honeycombs. They may also be constructed in non-Euclidean spaces, such as hyperbolic uniform honeycombs. Any finite uniform polytope can be projected to its circumsphere to form a uniform honeycomb in spherical space.

== Description ==
The dihedral angle of a regular dodecahedron is ~116.6°, so it is impossible to fit 4 of them on an edge in Euclidean 3-space. However in hyperbolic space a properly-scaled regular dodecahedron can be scaled so that its dihedral angles are reduced to 90 degrees, and then four fit exactly on every edge.

== Symmetry ==
It has a half symmetry construction, {5,3^{1,1}}, with two types (colors) of dodecahedra in the Wythoff construction. ↔.

== Images ==
Face planes of this honeycomb show the 2D hyperbolic order-4 pentagonal tiling, {5,4}.

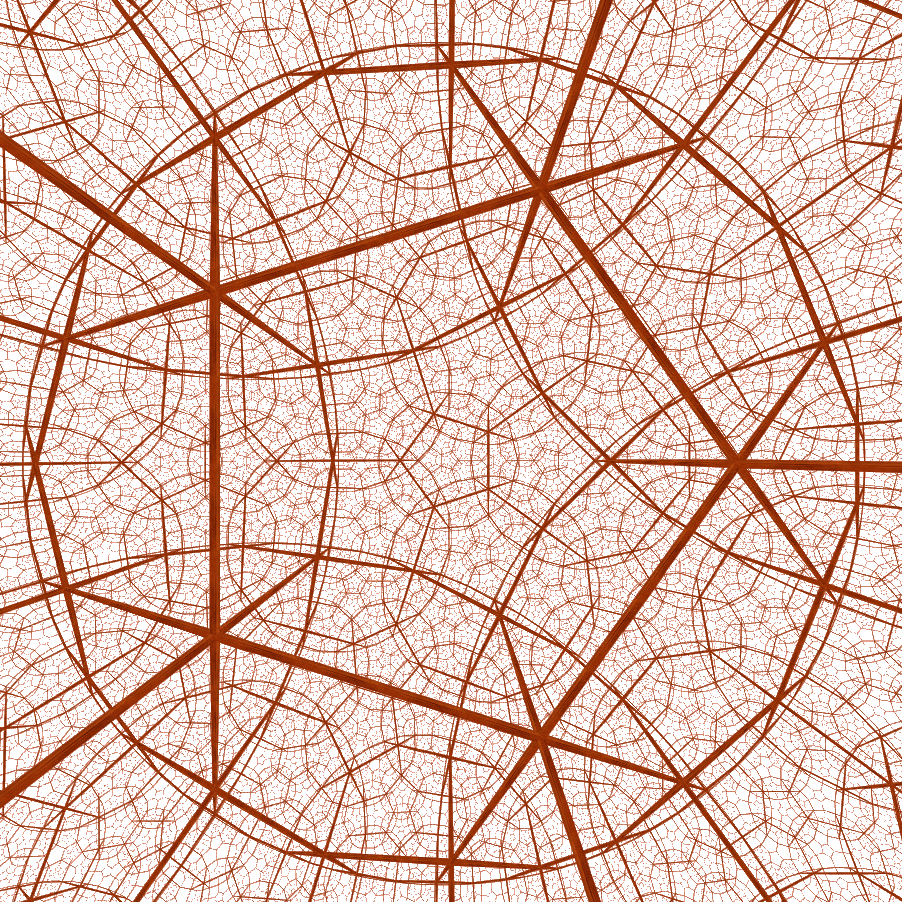
A view of the order-4 dodecahedral honeycomb under the Beltrami-Klein model

== Related polytopes and honeycombs ==
There are four regular compact honeycombs in 3D hyperbolic space:

Four regular compact honeycombs in H^{3}
{5,3,4}	{4,3,5}	{3,5,3}	{5,3,5}

There are fifteen uniform honeycombs in the [5,3,4] Coxeter group family, including this regular form.

[5,3,4] family honeycombs
{5,3,4}	r{5,3,4}	t{5,3,4}	rr{5,3,4}	t_{0,3}{5,3,4}	tr{5,3,4}	t_{0,1,3}{5,3,4}	t_{0,1,2,3}{5,3,4}
{4,3,5}	r{4,3,5}	t{4,3,5}	rr{4,3,5}	2t{4,3,5}	tr{4,3,5}	t_{0,1,3}{4,3,5}	t_{0,1,2,3}{4,3,5}

There are eleven uniform honeycombs in the bifurcating [5,3^{1,1}] Coxeter group family, including this honeycomb in its alternated form. This construction can be represented by alternation (checkerboard) with two colors of dodecahedral cells.

This honeycomb is also related to the 16-cell, cubic honeycomb, and order-4 hexagonal tiling honeycomb all which have octahedral vertex figures:

{p,3,4} regular honeycombs
Space	S^{3}	E^{3}	H^{3}				
Form	Finite	Affine	Compact	Paracompact	Noncompact		
Name	{3,3,4}	{4,3,4}	{5,3,4}	{6,3,4}	{7,3,4}	{8,3,4}	... {∞,3,4}
Image							
Cells	{3,3}	{4,3}	{5,3}	{6,3}	{7,3}	{8,3}	{∞,3}

This honeycomb is a part of a sequence of polychora and honeycombs with dodecahedral cells:

{5,3,p}
Space	S^{3}	H^{3}					
Form	Finite	Compact		Paracompact	Noncompact		
Name	{5,3,3}	{5,3,4}	{5,3,5}	{5,3,6}	{5,3,7}	{5,3,8}	... {5,3,∞}
Image							
Vertex figure	{3,3}	{3,4}	{3,5}	{3,6}	{3,7}	{3,8}	{3,∞}

=== Rectified order-4 dodecahedral honeycomb ===
Rectified order-4 dodecahedral honeycomb
Type	Uniform honeycombs in hyperbolic space
Schläfli symbol	r{5,3,4} r{5,3^{1,1}}
Coxeter diagram	↔
Cells	r{5,3} {3,4}
Faces	triangle {3} pentagon {5}
Vertex figure	square prism
Coxeter group	$\overline{BH}_3$, [4,3,5] $\overline{DH}_3$, [5,3^{1,1}]
Properties	Vertex-transitive, edge-transitive

The rectified order-4 dodecahedral honeycomb,, has alternating octahedron and icosidodecahedron cells, with a square prism vertex figure.

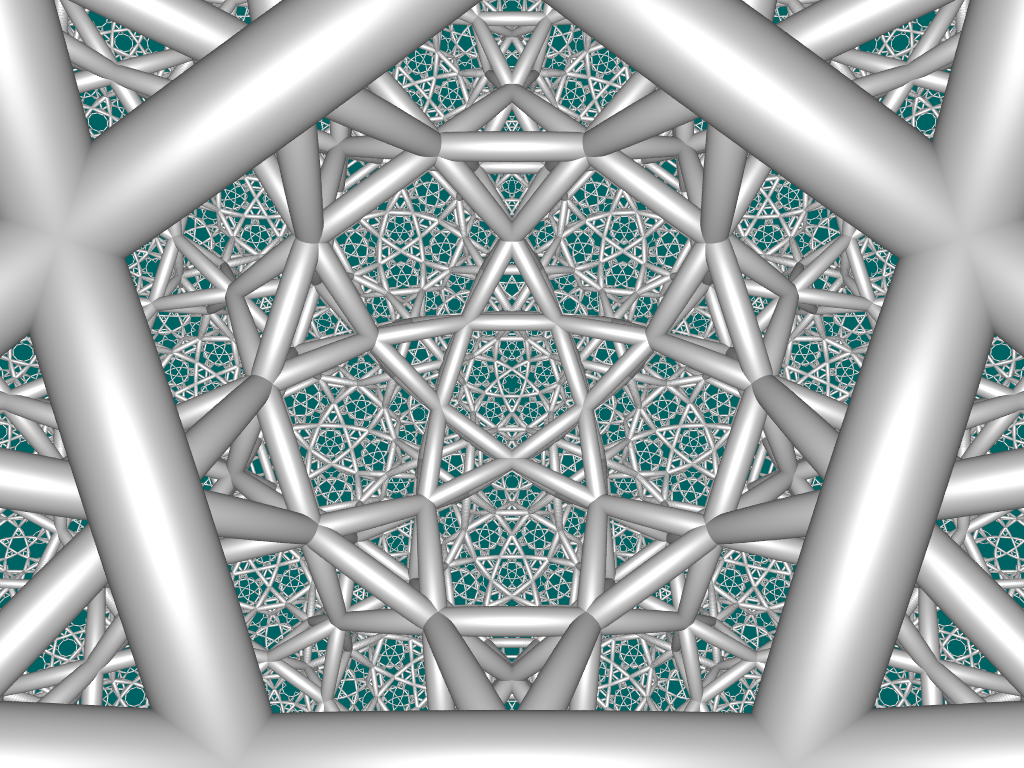
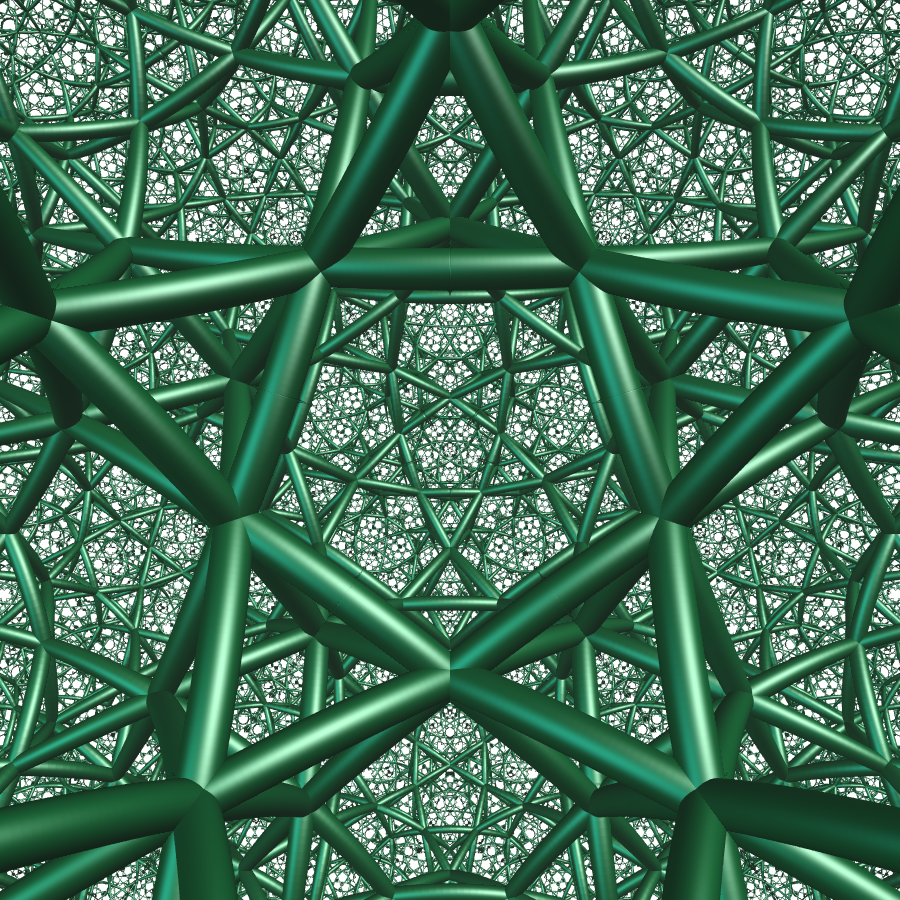

It can be seen as analogous to the 2D hyperbolic tetrapentagonal tiling, r{5,4}

==== Related honeycombs ====
There are four rectified compact regular honeycombs:

Four rectified regular compact honeycombs in H^{3}
Image				
Symbols	r{5,3,4}	r{4,3,5}	r{3,5,3}	r{5,3,5}
Vertex figure				

=== Truncated order-4 dodecahedral honeycomb ===
Truncated order-4 dodecahedral honeycomb
Type	Uniform honeycombs in hyperbolic space
Schläfli symbol	t{5,3,4} t{5,3^{1,1}}
Coxeter diagram	↔
Cells	t{5,3} {3,4}
Faces	triangle {3} decagon {10}
Vertex figure	square pyramid
Coxeter group	$\overline{BH}_3$, [4,3,5] $\overline{DH}_3$, [5,3^{1,1}]
Properties	Vertex-transitive

The truncated order-4 dodecahedral honeycomb,, has octahedron and truncated dodecahedron cells, with a square pyramid vertex figure.

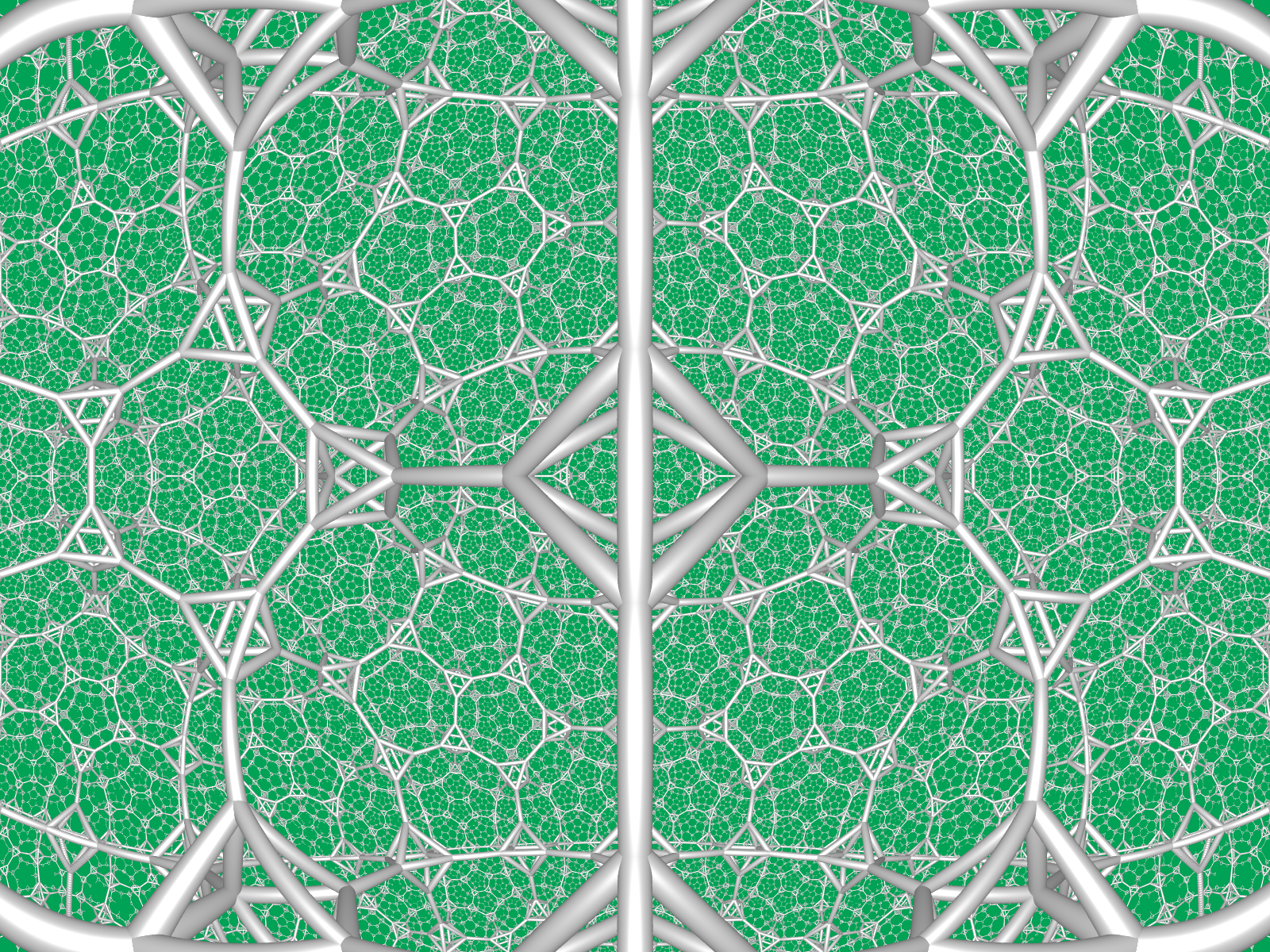

It can be seen as analogous to the 2D hyperbolic truncated order-4 pentagonal tiling, t{5,4} with truncated pentagon and square faces:

==== Related honeycombs ====
Four truncated regular compact honeycombs in H^{3}
Image				
Symbols	t{5,3,4}	t{4,3,5}	t{3,5,3}	t{5,3,5}
Vertex figure				

=== Bitruncated order-4 dodecahedral honeycomb ===
Bitruncated order-4 dodecahedral honeycomb Bitruncated order-5 cubic honeycomb
Type	Uniform honeycombs in hyperbolic space
Schläfli symbol	2t{5,3,4} 2t{5,3^{1,1}}
Coxeter diagram	↔
Cells	t{3,5} t{3,4}
Faces	square {4} pentagon {5} hexagon {6}
Vertex figure	digonal disphenoid
Coxeter group	$\overline{BH}_3$, [4,3,5] $\overline{DH}_3$, [5,3^{1,1}]
Properties	Vertex-transitive

The bitruncated order-4 dodecahedral honeycomb, or bitruncated order-5 cubic honeycomb,, has truncated octahedron and truncated icosahedron cells, with a digonal disphenoid vertex figure.

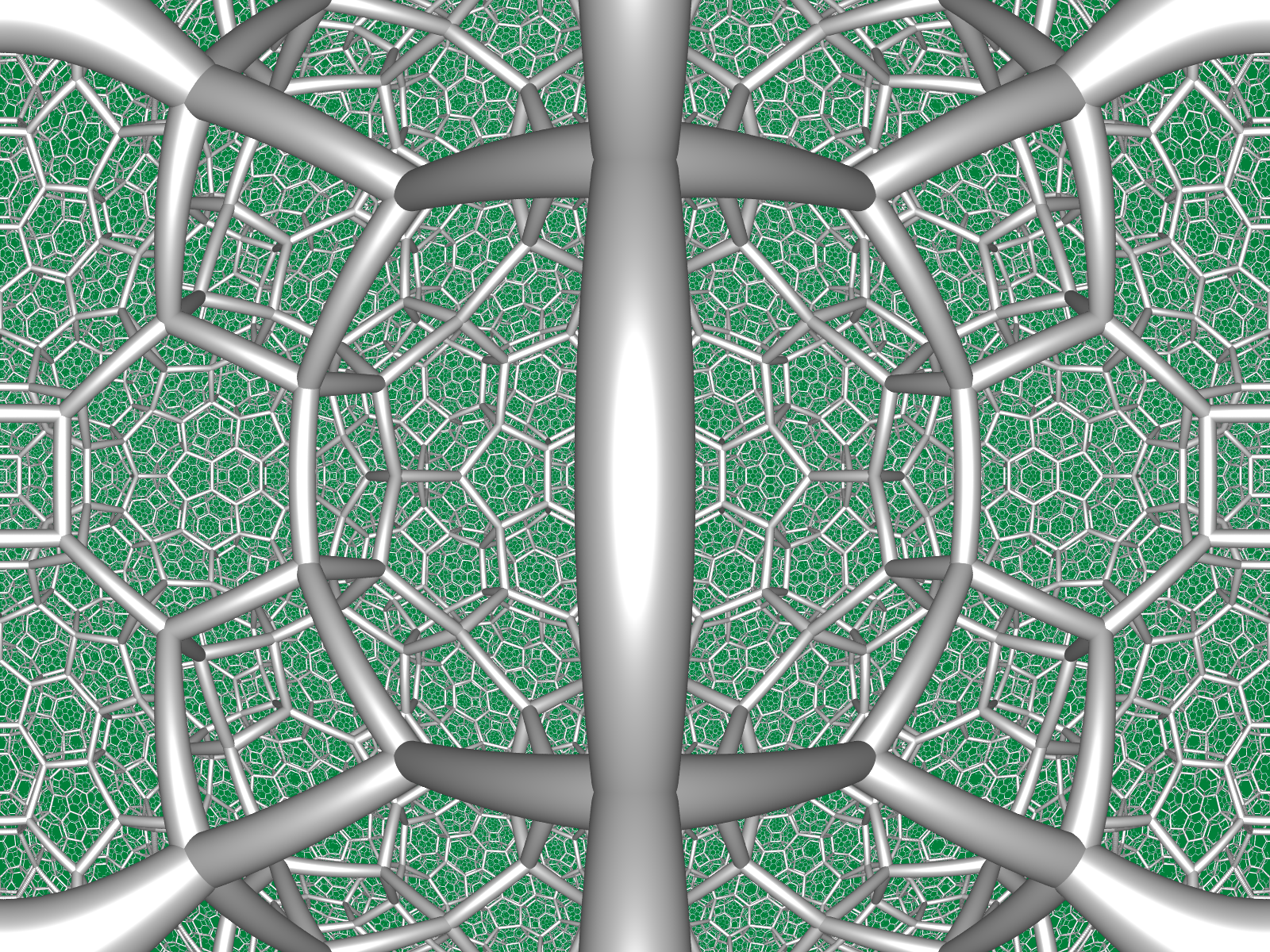

==== Related honeycombs ====
Three bitruncated compact honeycombs in H^{3}
Image			
Symbols	2t{4,3,5}	2t{3,5,3}	2t{5,3,5}
Vertex figure			

=== Cantellated order-4 dodecahedral honeycomb ===
Cantellated order-4 dodecahedral honeycomb
Type	Uniform honeycombs in hyperbolic space
Schläfli symbol	rr{5,3,4} rr{5,3^{1,1}}
Coxeter diagram	↔
Cells	rr{3,5} r{3,4} {}x{4}
Faces	triangle {3} square {4} pentagon {5}
Vertex figure	wedge
Coxeter group	$\overline{BH}_3$, [4,3,5] $\overline{DH}_3$, [5,3^{1,1}]
Properties	Vertex-transitive

The cantellated order-4 dodecahedral honeycomb,, has rhombicosidodecahedron, cuboctahedron, and cube cells, with a wedge vertex figure.

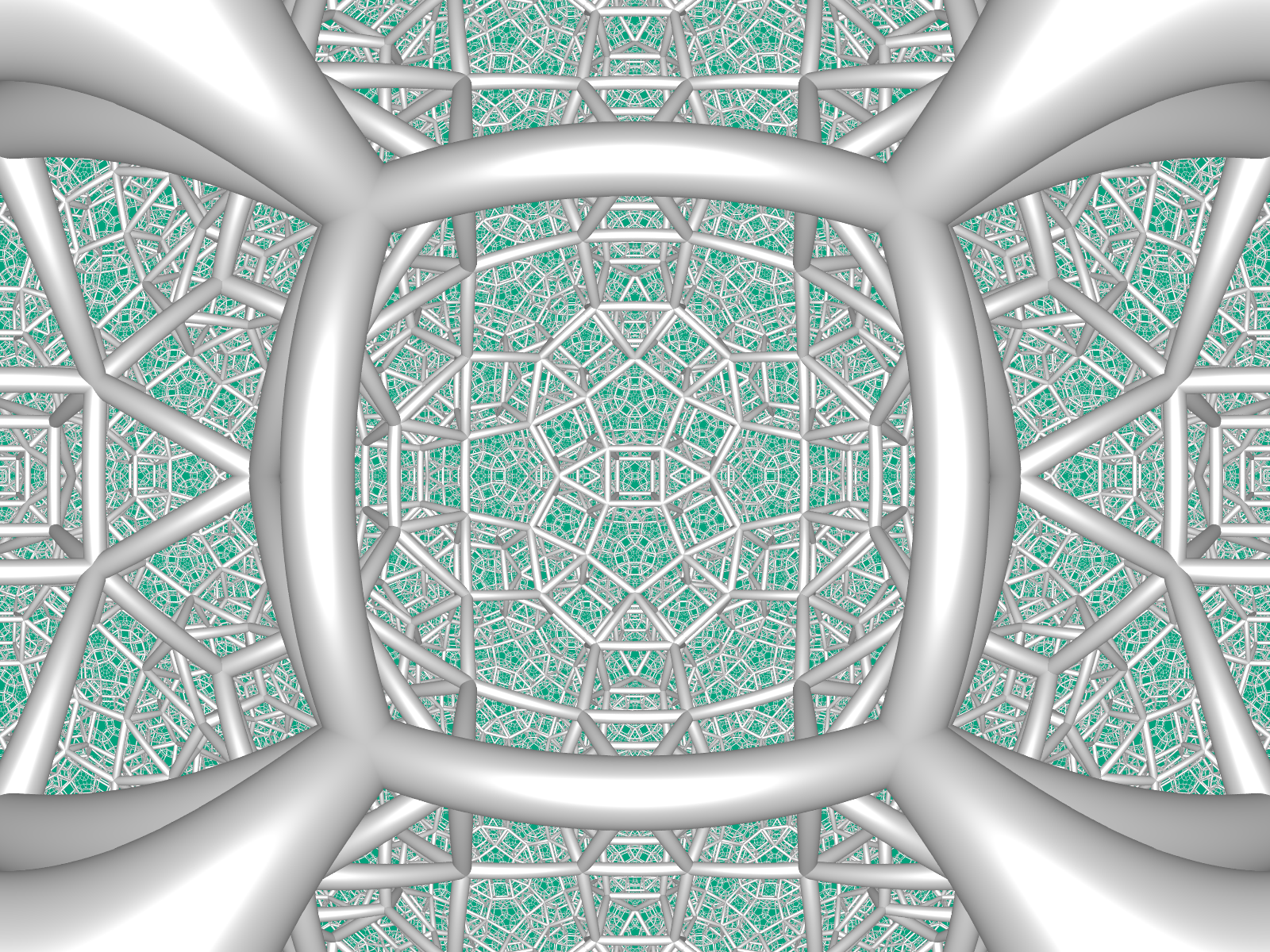

==== Related honeycombs ====
Four cantellated regular compact honeycombs in H^{3}

Image				
Symbols	rr{5,3,4}	rr{4,3,5}	rr{3,5,3}	rr{5,3,5}
Vertex figure				

=== Cantitruncated order-4 dodecahedral honeycomb ===
Cantitruncated order-4 dodecahedral honeycomb
Type	Uniform honeycombs in hyperbolic space
Schläfli symbol	tr{5,3,4} tr{5,3^{1,1}}
Coxeter diagram	↔
Cells	tr{3,5} t{3,4} {}x{4}
Faces	square {4} hexagon {6} decagon {10}
Vertex figure	mirrored sphenoid
Coxeter group	$\overline{BH}_3$, [4,3,5] $\overline{DH}_3$, [5,3^{1,1}]
Properties	Vertex-transitive

The cantitruncated order-4 dodecahedral honeycomb,, has truncated icosidodecahedron, truncated octahedron, and cube cells, with a mirrored sphenoid vertex figure.

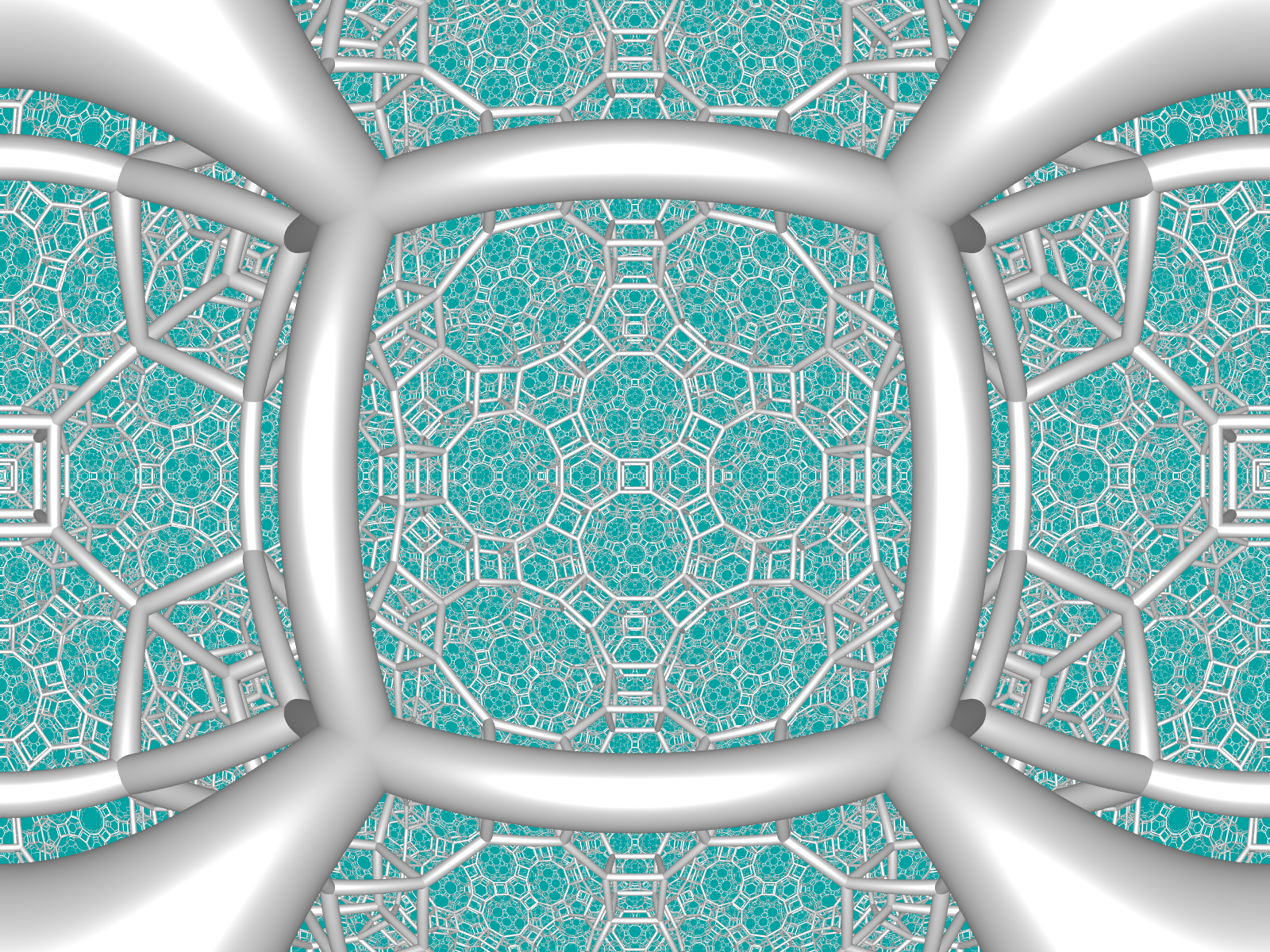

==== Related honeycombs ====
Four cantitruncated regular compact honeycombs in H^{3}
Image				
Symbols	tr{5,3,4}	tr{4,3,5}	tr{3,5,3}	tr{5,3,5}
Vertex figure				

=== Runcinated order-4 dodecahedral honeycomb ===
The runcinated order-4 dodecahedral honeycomb is the same as the runcinated order-5 cubic honeycomb.

=== Runcitruncated order-4 dodecahedral honeycomb ===
Runcitruncated order-4 dodecahedral honeycomb
Type	Uniform honeycombs in hyperbolic space
Schläfli symbol	t_{0,1,3}{5,3,4}
Coxeter diagram	
Cells	t{5,3} rr{3,4} {}x{10} {}x{4}
Faces	triangle {3} square {4} decagon {10}
Vertex figure	isosceles-trapezoidal pyramid
Coxeter group	$\overline{BH}_3$, [4,3,5]
Properties	Vertex-transitive

The runcitruncated order-4 dodecahedral honeycomb,, has truncated dodecahedron, rhombicuboctahedron, decagonal prism, and cube cells, with an isosceles-trapezoidal pyramid vertex figure.

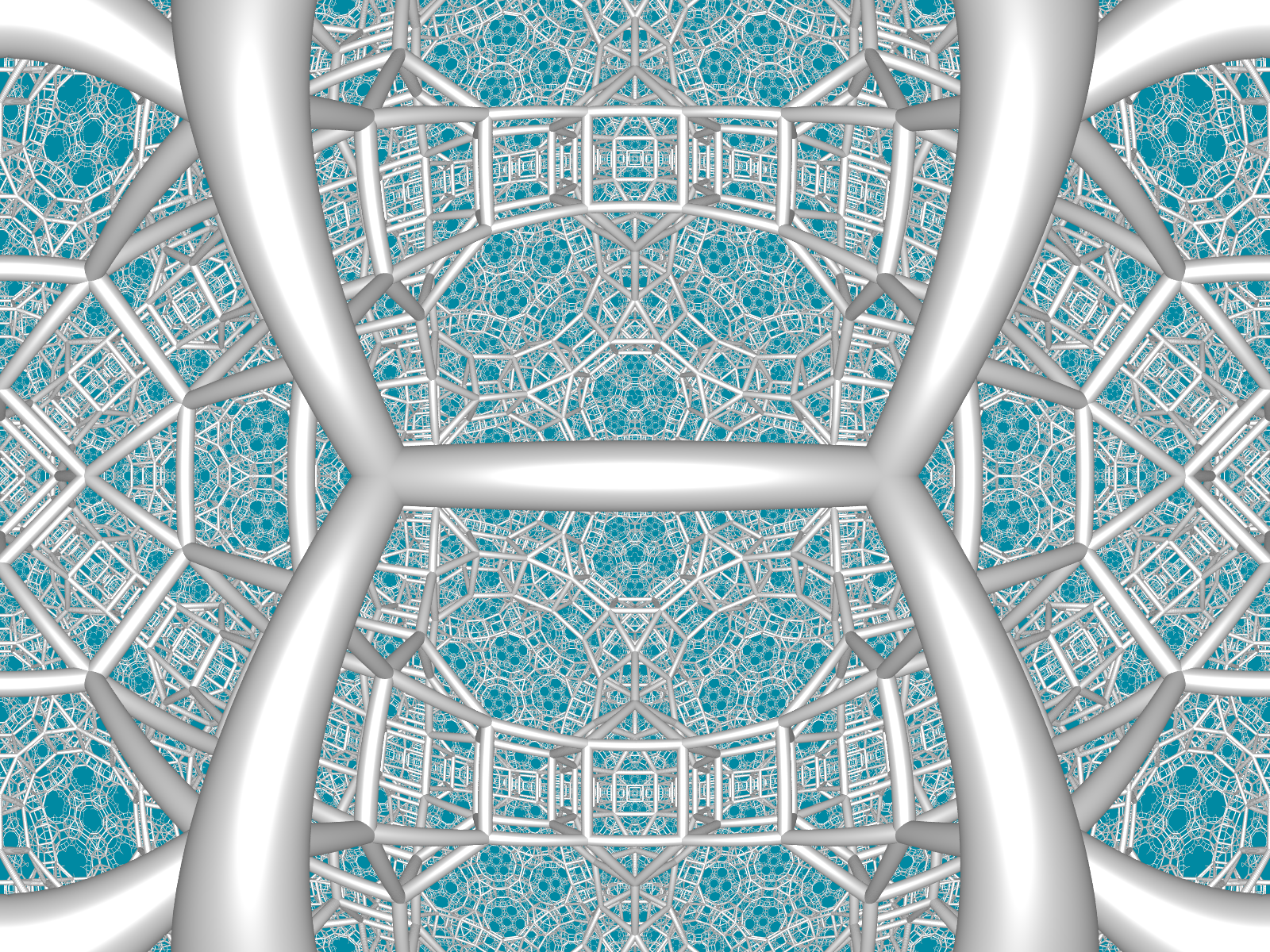

==== Related honeycombs ====
Four runcitruncated regular compact honeycombs in H^{3}

Image				
Symbols	t_{0,1,3}{5,3,4}	t_{0,1,3}{4,3,5}	t_{0,1,3}{3,5,3}	t_{0,1,3}{5,3,5}
Vertex figure				

=== Runcicantellated order-4 dodecahedral honeycomb ===
The runcicantellated order-4 dodecahedral honeycomb is the same as the runcitruncated order-5 cubic honeycomb.

=== Omnitruncated order-4 dodecahedral honeycomb ===
The omnitruncated order-4 dodecahedral honeycomb is the same as the omnitruncated order-5 cubic honeycomb.

== See also ==
- Convex uniform honeycombs in hyperbolic space
- Regular tessellations of hyperbolic 3-space
- Poincaré homology sphere Poincaré dodecahedral space
- Seifert–Weber space Seifert–Weber dodecahedral space
