= Order-3-4 heptagonal honeycomb =

Order-3-4 heptagonal honeycomb
Type	Regular honeycomb
Schläfli symbol	{7,3,4}
Coxeter diagram	=
Cells	{7,3}
Faces	heptagon {7}
Vertex figure	octahedron {3,4}
Dual	{4,3,7}
Coxeter group	[7,3,4]
Properties	Regular

In the geometry of hyperbolic 3-space, the order-3-4 heptagonal honeycomb or 7,3,4 honeycomb a regular space-filling tessellation (or honeycomb). Each infinite cell consists of a heptagonal tiling whose vertices lie on a 2-hypercycle, each of which has a limiting circle on the ideal sphere.

== Geometry ==
The Schläfli symbol of the order-3-4 heptagonal honeycomb is {7,3,4}, with four heptagonal tilings meeting at each edge. The vertex figure of this honeycomb is an octahedron, {3,4}.

Poincaré disk model (vertex centered)	One hyperideal cell limits to a circle on the ideal surface	Ideal surface

== Related polytopes and honeycombs ==
It is a part of a series of regular polytopes and honeycombs with {p,3,4} Schläfli symbol, and octahedral vertex figures:

{p,3,4} regular honeycombs
Space	S^{3}	E^{3}	H^{3}				
Form	Finite	Affine	Compact	Paracompact	Noncompact		
Name	{3,3,4}	{4,3,4}	{5,3,4}	{6,3,4}	{7,3,4}	{8,3,4}	... {∞,3,4}
Image							
Cells	{3,3}	{4,3}	{5,3}	{6,3}	{7,3}	{8,3}	{∞,3}

=== Order-3-4 octagonal honeycomb ===
Order-3-4 octagonal honeycomb
Type	Regular honeycomb
Schläfli symbol	{8,3,4}
Coxeter diagram	=
Cells	{8,3}
Faces	octagon {8}
Vertex figure	octahedron {3,4}
Dual	{4,3,8}
Coxeter group	[8,3,4] [8,3^{1,1}]
Properties	Regular

In the geometry of hyperbolic 3-space, the order-3-4 octagonal honeycomb or 8,3,4 honeycomb a regular space-filling tessellation (or honeycomb). Each infinite cell consists of an octagonal tiling whose vertices lie on a 2-hypercycle, each of which has a limiting circle on the ideal sphere.

The Schläfli symbol of the order-3-4 octagonal honeycomb is {8,3,4}, with four octagonal tilings meeting at each edge. The vertex figure of this honeycomb is an octahedron, {3,4}.

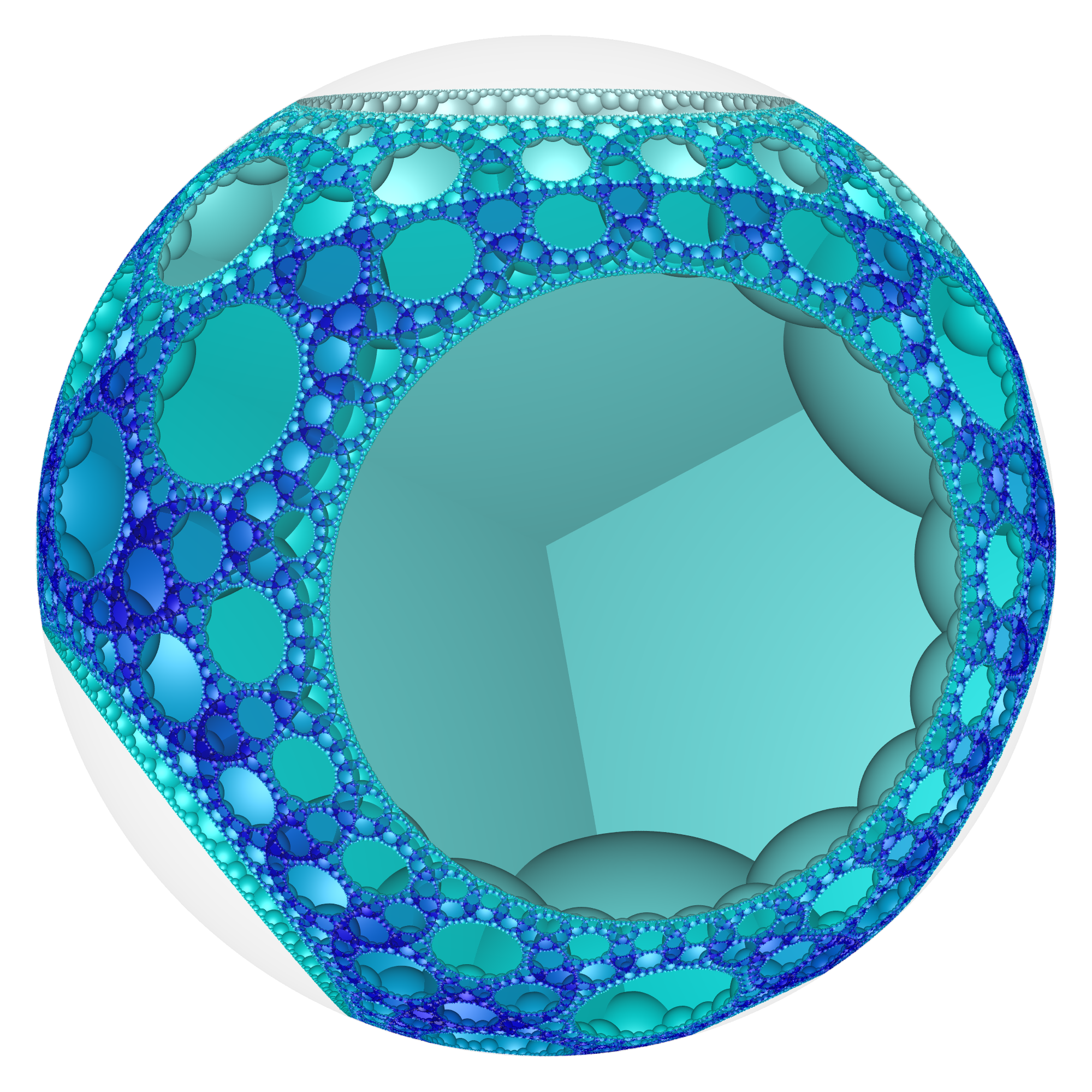
Poincaré disk model
(vertex centered)

=== Order-3-4 apeirogonal honeycomb ===
Order-3-4 apeirogonal honeycomb
Type	Regular honeycomb
Schläfli symbol	{∞,3,4}
Coxeter diagram	=
Cells	{∞,3}
Faces	apeirogon {∞}
Vertex figure	octahedron {3,4}
Dual	{4,3,∞}
Coxeter group	[∞,3,4] [∞,3^{1,1}]
Properties	Regular

In the geometry of hyperbolic 3-space, the order-3-4 apeirogonal honeycomb or ∞,3,4 honeycomb a regular space-filling tessellation (or honeycomb). Each infinite cell consists of an order-3 apeirogonal tiling whose vertices lie on a 2-hypercycle, each of which has a limiting circle on the ideal sphere.

The Schläfli symbol of the order-3-4 apeirogonal honeycomb is {∞,3,4}, with four order-3 apeirogonal tilings meeting at each edge. The vertex figure of this honeycomb is an octahedron, {3,4}.

Poincaré disk model (vertex centered)	Ideal surface

== See also ==
- Convex uniform honeycombs in hyperbolic space
- List of regular polytopes
