= Wedge (geometry) =

Polyhedron defined by two triangles and three trapezoid faces

- Faces: 2 triangles, 3 quadrilaterals
- Edges: 9
- Vertices: 6

In solid geometry, a wedge is a polyhedron defined by two triangles and three trapezoid faces. A wedge has five faces, nine edges, and six vertices.

== Properties ==
A wedge is a polyhedron of a rectangular base, with the faces are two isosceles triangles and two trapezoids that meet at the top of an edge.. A prismatoid is defined as a polyhedron where its vertices lie on two parallel planes, with its lateral faces are triangles, trapezoids, and parallelograms; the wedge is an example of prismatoid because of its top edge is parallel to the rectangular base. The volume of a wedge is
$$V = bh \left(\frac{a}{3}+\frac{c}{6}\right),$$
where the base rectangle is $a$ by $b$, $c$ is the apex edge length parallel to $a$, and $h$ is the height from the base rectangle to the apex edge.

== Examples ==
A wedge that is parallel

In some special cases, the wedge is the right prism if all edges connecting triangles are equal in length, and the triangular faces are perpendicular to the rectangular base.

Wedges can be created from decomposition of other polyhedra. For instance, the dodecahedron can be divided into a central cube with 6 wedges covering the cube faces. The orientations of the wedges are such that the triangle and trapezoid faces can connect and form a regular pentagon.

Two obtuse wedges can be formed by bisecting a regular tetrahedron on a plane parallel to two opposite edges.

Special cases
Obtuse wedge as a bisected regular tetrahedron	A wedge constructed from 8 triangular faces and 2 squares. It can be seen as a tetrahedron augmented by two square pyramids.	The regular dodecahedron can be decomposed into a central cube and 6 wedges over the 6 square faces.
