= Hexagonal tiling honeycomb =

Regular paracompact honeycomb

Hexagonal tiling honeycomb
Perspective projection view within Poincaré disk model
Type	Hyperbolic regular honeycomb Paracompact uniform honeycomb
Schläfli symbols	{6,3,3} t{3,6,3} 2t{6,3,6} 2t{6,3^{[3]}} t{3^{[3,3]}}
Coxeter diagrams	↔ ↔ ↔ ↔
Cells	{6,3}
Faces	hexagon {6}
Edge figure	triangle {3}
Vertex figure	tetrahedron {3,3}
Dual	Order-6 tetrahedral honeycomb
Coxeter groups	${\overline{V}}_3$, [3,3,6] ${\overline{Y}}_3$, [3,6,3] ${\overline{Z}}_3$, [6,3,6] ${\overline{VP}}_3$, [6,3^{[3]}] ${\overline{PP}}_3$, [3^{[3,3]}]
Properties	Regular

In the field of hyperbolic geometry, the hexagonal tiling honeycomb is one of 11 regular paracompact honeycombs in 3-dimensional hyperbolic space. It is paracompact because it has cells composed of an infinite number of faces. Each cell is a hexagonal tiling whose vertices lie on a horosphere, a surface in hyperbolic space that approaches a single ideal point at infinity.

The Schläfli symbol of the hexagonal tiling honeycomb is {6,3,3}. Since that of the hexagonal tiling is {6,3}, this honeycomb has three such hexagonal tilings meeting at each edge. Since the Schläfli symbol of the tetrahedron is {3,3}, the vertex figure of this honeycomb is a tetrahedron. Thus, four hexagonal tilings meet at each vertex of this honeycomb, six hexagons meet at each vertex, and four edges meet at each vertex.

== Images ==
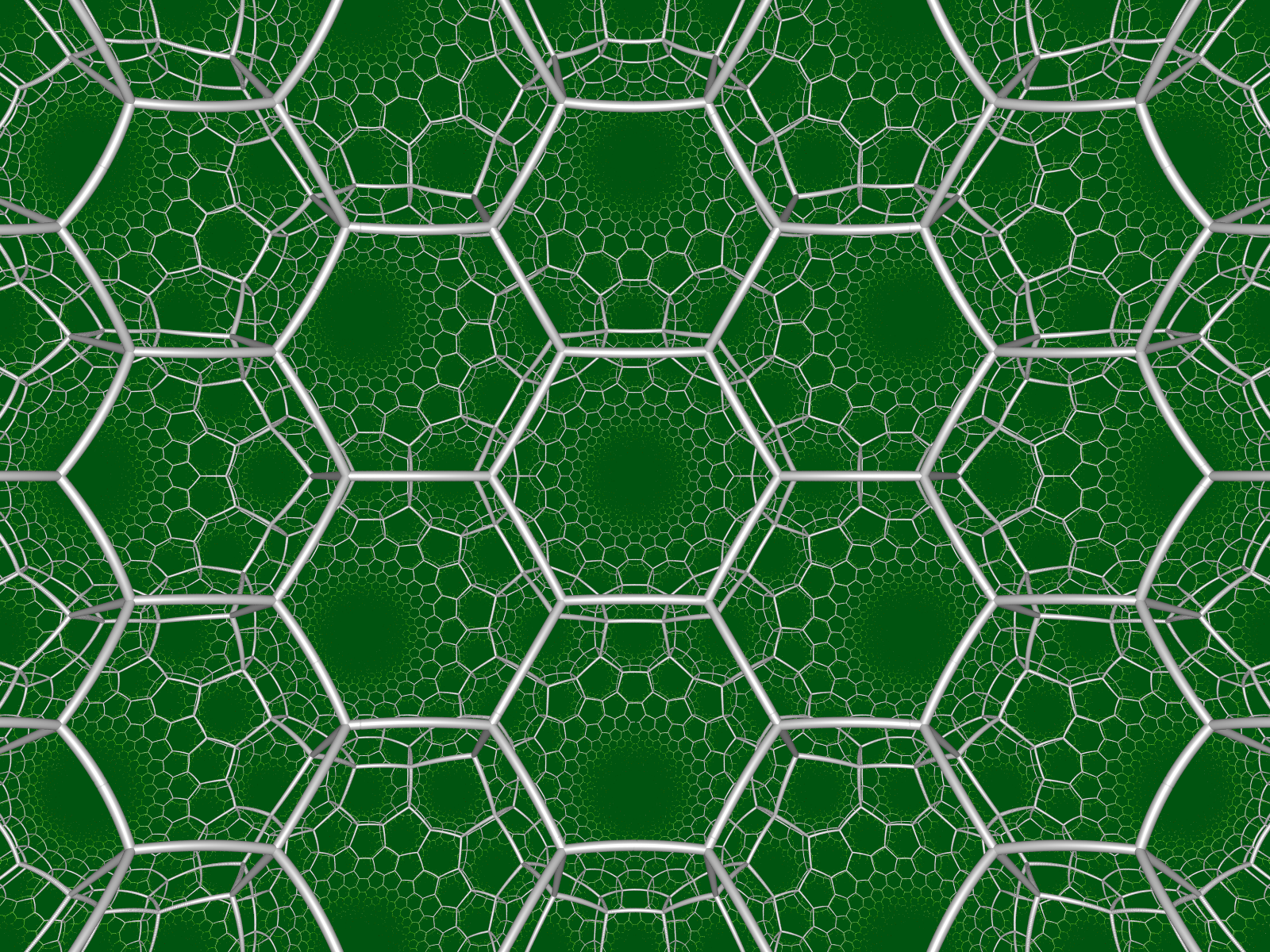

Viewed in perspective outside of a Poincaré disk model, the image above shows one hexagonal tiling cell within the honeycomb, and its mid-radius horosphere (the horosphere incident with edge midpoints). In this projection, the hexagons grow infinitely small towards the infinite boundary, asymptoting towards a single ideal point. It can be seen as similar to the order-3 apeirogonal tiling, {∞,3} of H^{2}, with horocycles circumscribing vertices of apeirogonal faces.

{6,3,3}	{∞,3}
One hexagonal tiling cell of the hexagonal tiling honeycomb	An order-3 apeirogonal tiling with a green apeirogon and its horocycle

== Symmetry constructions ==
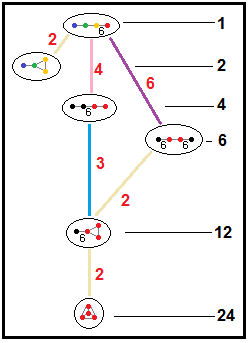
Subgroup relations

It has a total of five reflectional constructions from five related Coxeter groups all with four mirrors and only the first being regular: [6,3,3], [3,6,3], [6,3,6], [6,3^{[3]}] and [3^{[3,3]}], having 1, 4, 6, 12 and 24 times larger fundamental domains respectively. In Coxeter notation subgroup markups, they are related as: [6,(3,3)^{*}] (remove 3 mirrors, index 24 subgroup); [3,6,3^{*}] or [3^{*},6,3] (remove 2 mirrors, index 6 subgroup); [1^{+},6,3,6,1^{+}] (remove two orthogonal mirrors, index 4 subgroup); all of these are isomorphic to [3^{[3,3]}]. The ringed Coxeter diagrams are,,, and, representing different types (colors) of hexagonal tilings in the Wythoff construction.

== Related polytopes and honeycombs ==
The hexagonal tiling honeycomb is a regular hyperbolic honeycomb in 3-space, and one of 11 which are paracompact.

11 paracompact regular honeycombs
{6,3,3}	{6,3,4}	{6,3,5}	{6,3,6}	{4,4,3}	{4,4,4}
{3,3,6}	{4,3,6}	{5,3,6}	{3,6,3}	{3,4,4}	

It is one of 15 uniform paracompact honeycombs in the [6,3,3] Coxeter group, along with its dual, the order-6 tetrahedral honeycomb.

[6,3,3] family honeycombs
{6,3,3}	r{6,3,3}	t{6,3,3}	rr{6,3,3}	t_{0,3}{6,3,3}	tr{6,3,3}	t_{0,1,3}{6,3,3}	t_{0,1,2,3}{6,3,3}
{3,3,6}	r{3,3,6}	t{3,3,6}	rr{3,3,6}	2t{3,3,6}	tr{3,3,6}	t_{0,1,3}{3,3,6}	t_{0,1,2,3}{3,3,6}

It is part of a sequence of regular polychora, which include the 5-cell {3,3,3}, tesseract {4,3,3}, and 120-cell {5,3,3} of Euclidean 4-space, along with other hyperbolic honeycombs containing tetrahedral vertex figures.

{p,3,3} honeycombs
Space		S^{3}			H^{3}			
Form		Finite			Paracompact	Noncompact		
Name		{3,3,3}	{4,3,3}	{5,3,3}	{6,3,3}	{7,3,3}	{8,3,3}	... {∞,3,3}
Image								
Coxeter diagrams	1							
Coxeter diagrams	4							
Coxeter diagrams	6							
Coxeter diagrams	12							
Coxeter diagrams	24							
Cells {p,3}		{3,3}	{4,3}	{5,3}	{6,3}	{7,3}	{8,3}	{∞,3}

It is also part of a sequence of regular honeycombs of the form {6,3,p}, which are each composed of hexagonal tiling cells:

{6,3,p} honeycombs
Space	H^{3}						
Form	Paracompact				Noncompact		
Name	{6,3,3}	{6,3,4}	{6,3,5}	{6,3,6}	{6,3,7}	{6,3,8}	... {6,3,∞}
Coxeter							
Image							
Vertex figure {3,p}	{3,3}	{3,4}	{3,5}	{3,6}	{3,7}	{3,8}	{3,∞}

=== Rectified hexagonal tiling honeycomb ===
Rectified hexagonal tiling honeycomb
Type	Paracompact uniform honeycomb
Schläfli symbols	r{6,3,3} or t_{1}{6,3,3}
Coxeter diagrams	↔
Cells	{3,3} r{6,3} or
Faces	triangle {3} hexagon {6}
Vertex figure	triangular prism
Coxeter groups	${\overline{V}}_3$, [3,3,6] ${\overline{P}}_3$, [3,3^{[3]}]
Properties	Vertex-transitive, edge-transitive

The rectified hexagonal tiling honeycomb, t_{1}{6,3,3}, has tetrahedral and trihexagonal tiling facets, with a triangular prism vertex figure. The half-symmetry construction alternates two types of tetrahedra.

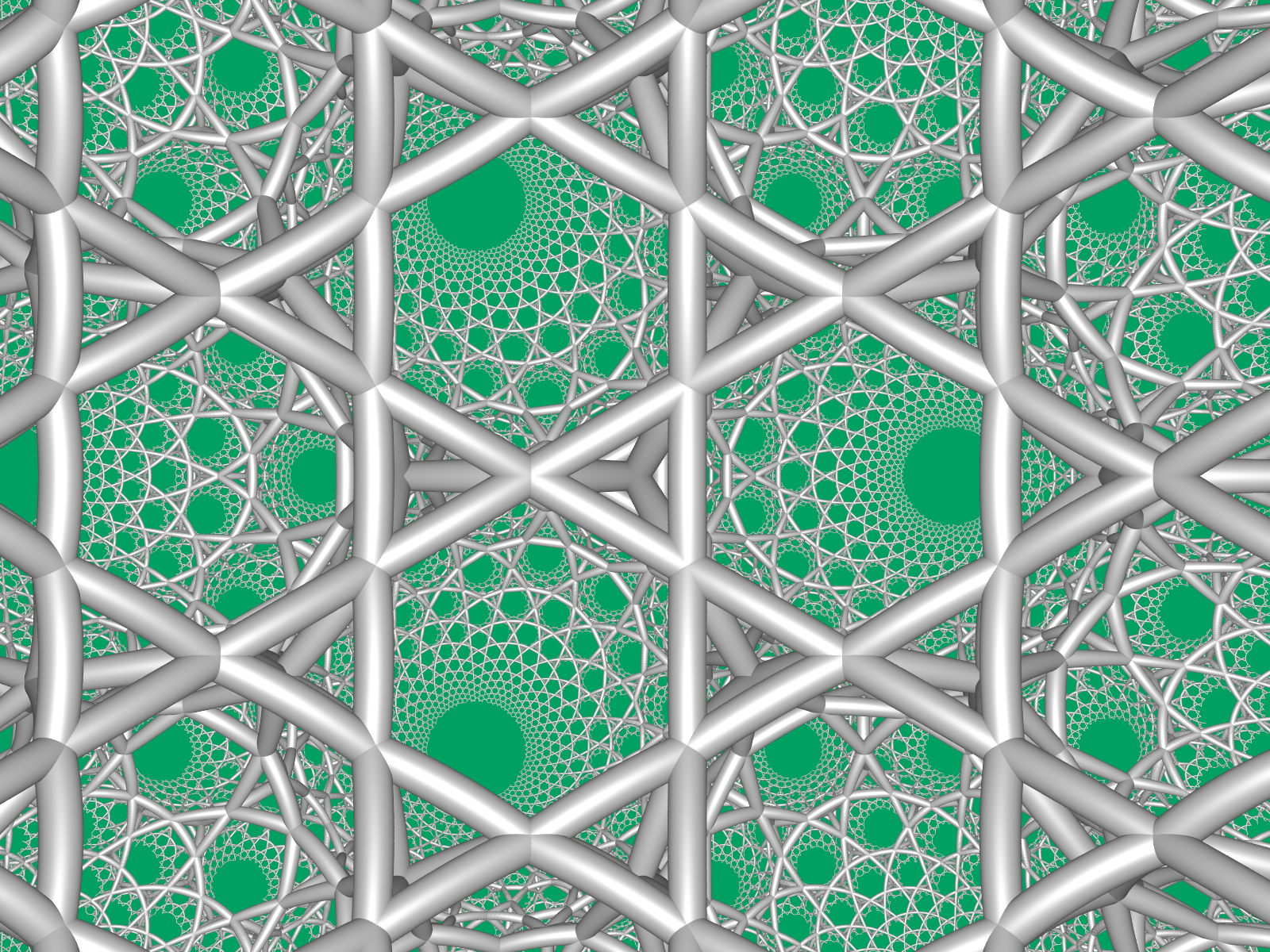

Hexagonal tiling honeycomb	Rectified hexagonal tiling honeycomb or
Related H^{2} tilings
Order-3 apeirogonal tiling	Triapeirogonal tiling or

=== Truncated hexagonal tiling honeycomb ===
Truncated hexagonal tiling honeycomb
Type	Paracompact uniform honeycomb
Schläfli symbol	t{6,3,3} or t_{0,1}{6,3,3}
Coxeter diagram	
Cells	{3,3} t{6,3}
Faces	triangle {3} dodecagon {12}
Vertex figure	triangular pyramid
Coxeter groups	${\overline{V}}_3$, [3,3,6]
Properties	Vertex-transitive

The truncated hexagonal tiling honeycomb, t_{0,1}{6,3,3}, has tetrahedral and truncated hexagonal tiling facets, with a triangular pyramid vertex figure.

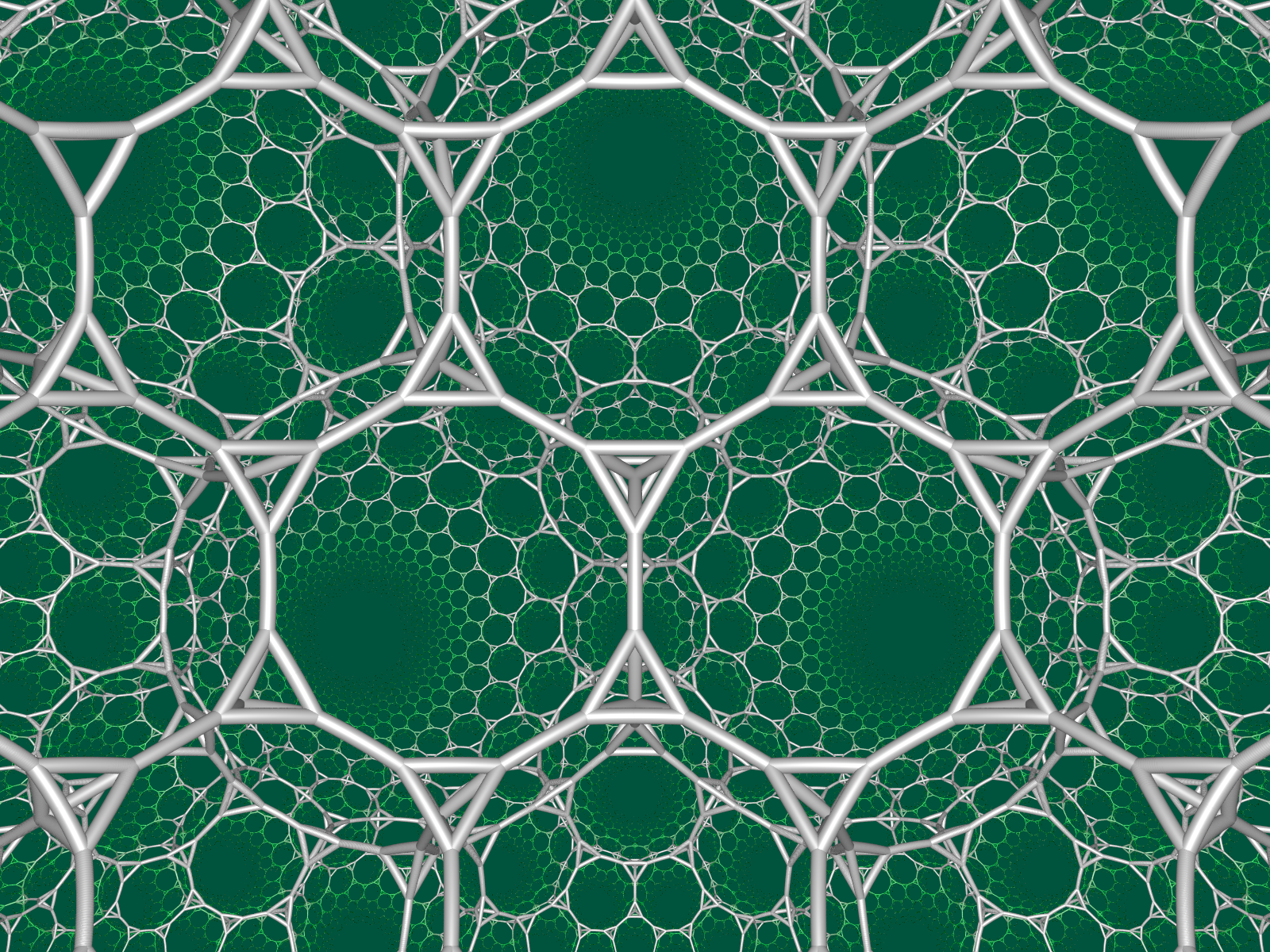

It is similar to the 2D hyperbolic truncated order-3 apeirogonal tiling, t{∞,3} with apeirogonal and triangle faces:

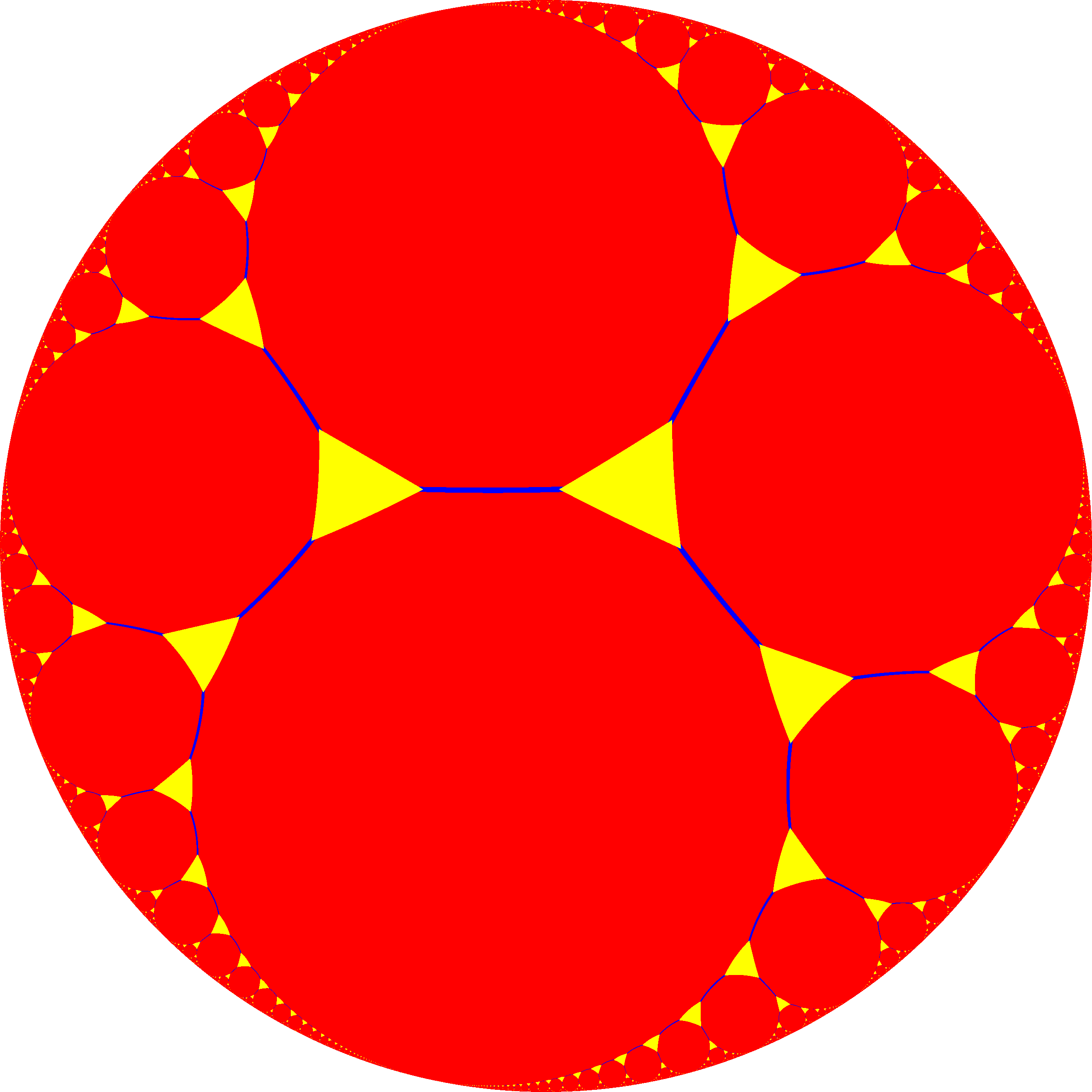

=== Bitruncated hexagonal tiling honeycomb ===
Bitruncated hexagonal tiling honeycomb Bitruncated order-6 tetrahedral honeycomb
Type	Paracompact uniform honeycomb
Schläfli symbol	2t{6,3,3} or t_{1,2}{6,3,3}
Coxeter diagram	↔
Cells	t{3,3} t{3,6}
Faces	triangle {3} hexagon {6}
Vertex figure	digonal disphenoid
Coxeter groups	${\overline{V}}_3$, [3,3,6] ${\overline{P}}_3$, [3,3^{[3]}]
Properties	Vertex-transitive

The bitruncated hexagonal tiling honeycomb or bitruncated order-6 tetrahedral honeycomb, t_{1,2}{6,3,3}, has truncated tetrahedron and hexagonal tiling cells, with a digonal disphenoid vertex figure.

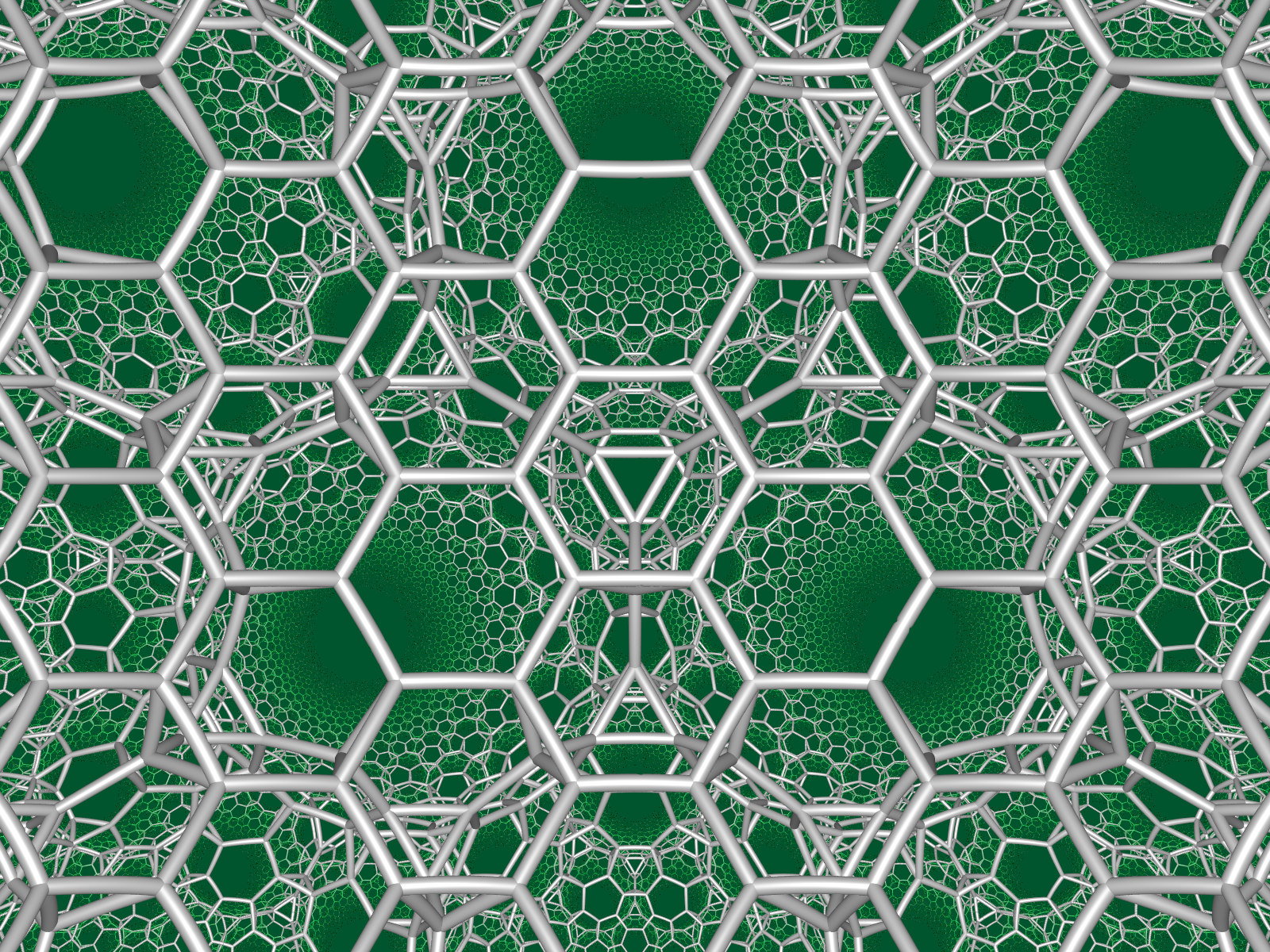

=== Cantellated hexagonal tiling honeycomb ===
Cantellated hexagonal tiling honeycomb
Type	Paracompact uniform honeycomb
Schläfli symbol	rr{6,3,3} or t_{0,2}{6,3,3}
Coxeter diagram	
Cells	r{3,3} rr{6,3} {}×{3}
Faces	triangle {3} square {4} hexagon {6}
Vertex figure	wedge
Coxeter groups	${\overline{V}}_3$, [3,3,6]
Properties	Vertex-transitive

The cantellated hexagonal tiling honeycomb, t_{0,2}{6,3,3}, has octahedron, rhombitrihexagonal tiling, and triangular prism cells, with a wedge vertex figure.

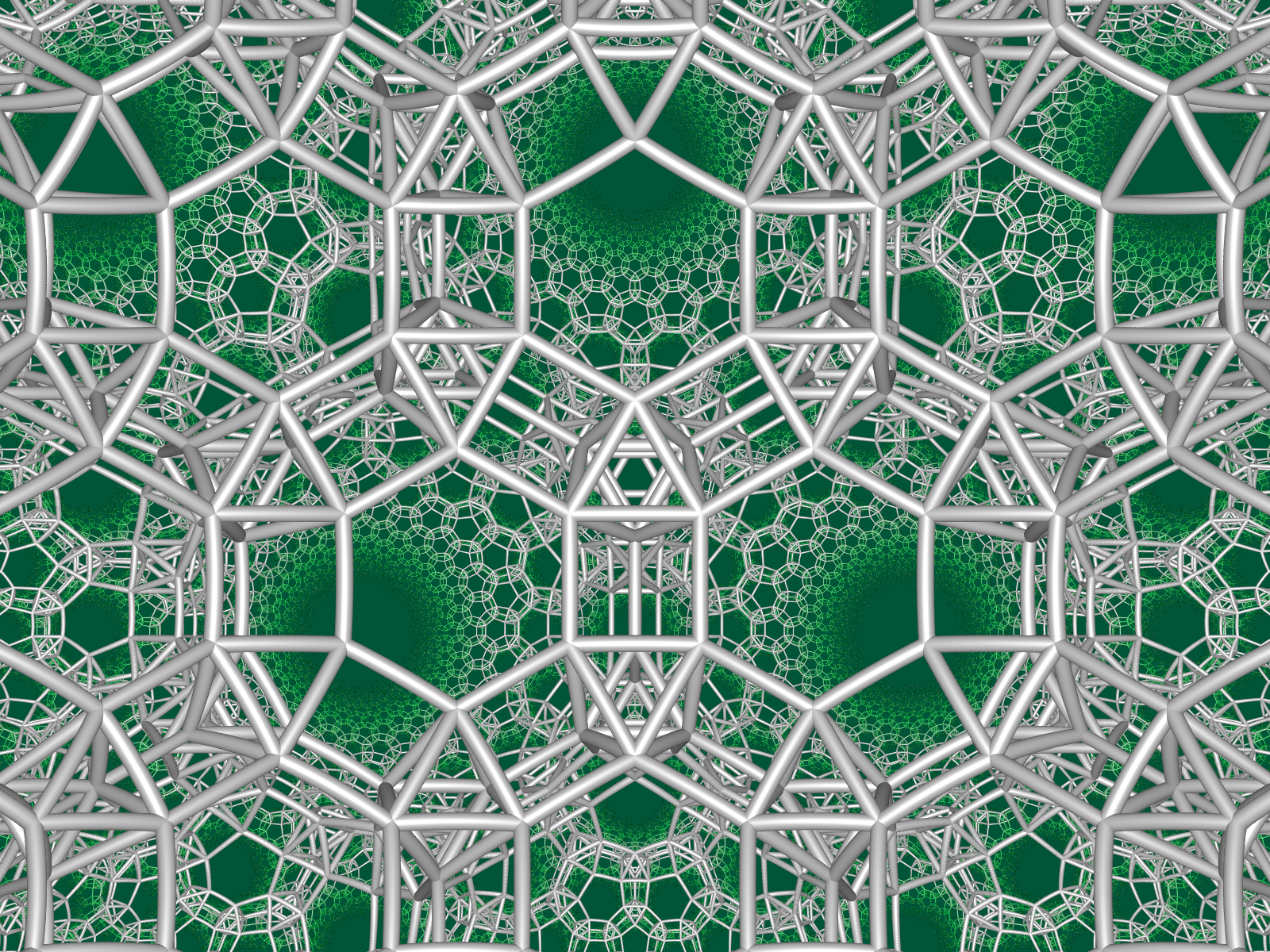

=== Cantitruncated hexagonal tiling honeycomb ===
Cantitruncated hexagonal tiling honeycomb
Type	Paracompact uniform honeycomb
Schläfli symbol	tr{6,3,3} or t_{0,1,2}{6,3,3}
Coxeter diagram	
Cells	t{3,3} tr{6,3} {}×{3}
Faces	triangle {3} square {4} hexagon {6} dodecagon {12}
Vertex figure	mirrored sphenoid
Coxeter groups	${\overline{V}}_3$, [3,3,6]
Properties	Vertex-transitive

The cantitruncated hexagonal tiling honeycomb, t_{0,1,2}{6,3,3}, has truncated tetrahedron, truncated trihexagonal tiling, and triangular prism cells, with a mirrored sphenoid vertex figure.

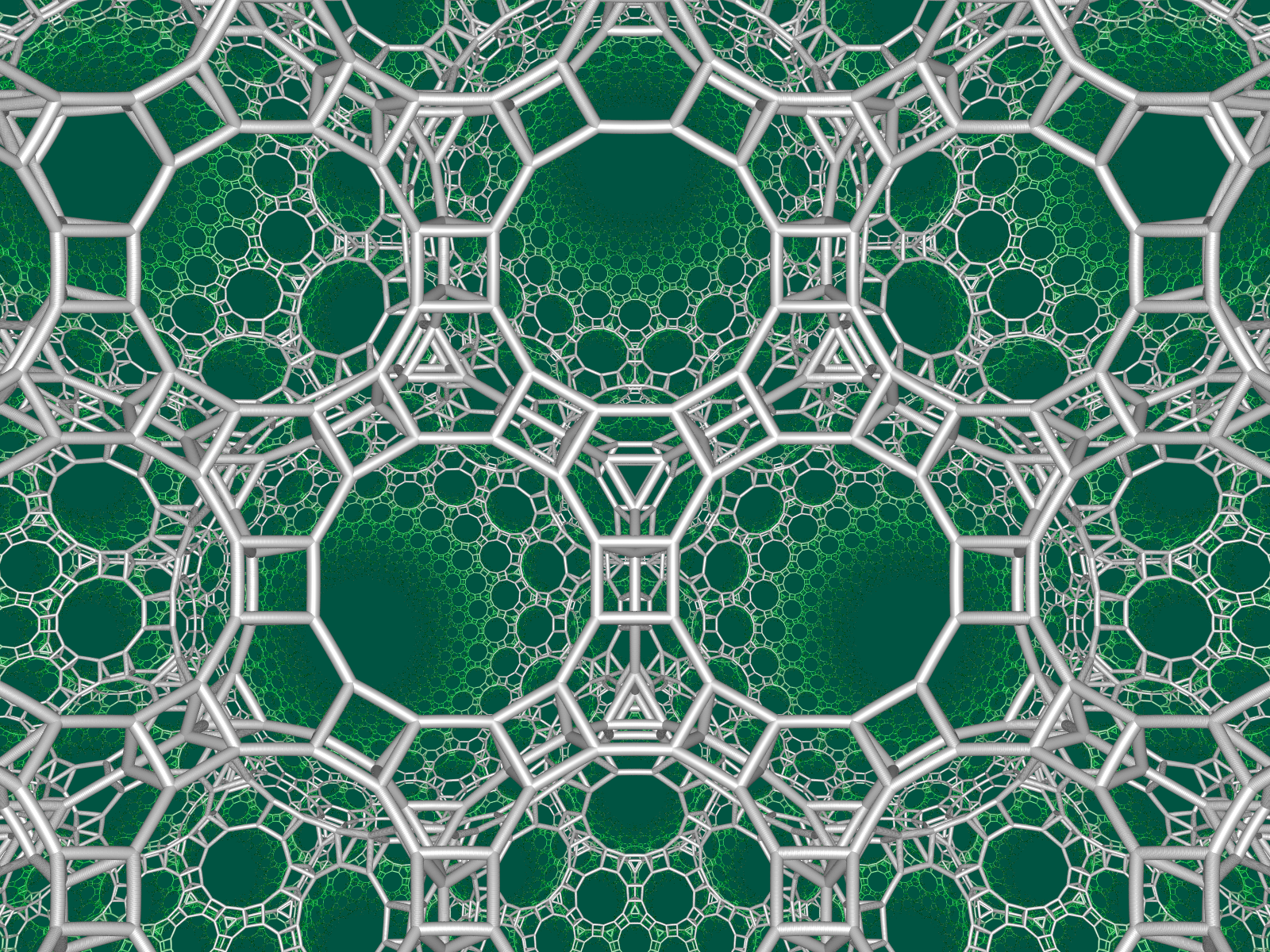

=== Runcinated hexagonal tiling honeycomb ===
Runcinated hexagonal tiling honeycomb
Type	Paracompact uniform honeycomb
Schläfli symbol	t_{0,3}{6,3,3}
Coxeter diagram	
Cells	{3,3} {6,3} {}×{6} {}×{3}
Faces	triangle {3} square {4} hexagon {6}
Vertex figure	irregular triangular antiprism
Coxeter groups	${\overline{V}}_3$, [3,3,6]
Properties	Vertex-transitive

The runcinated hexagonal tiling honeycomb, t_{0,3}{6,3,3}, has tetrahedron, hexagonal tiling, hexagonal prism, and triangular prism cells, with an irregular triangular antiprism vertex figure.

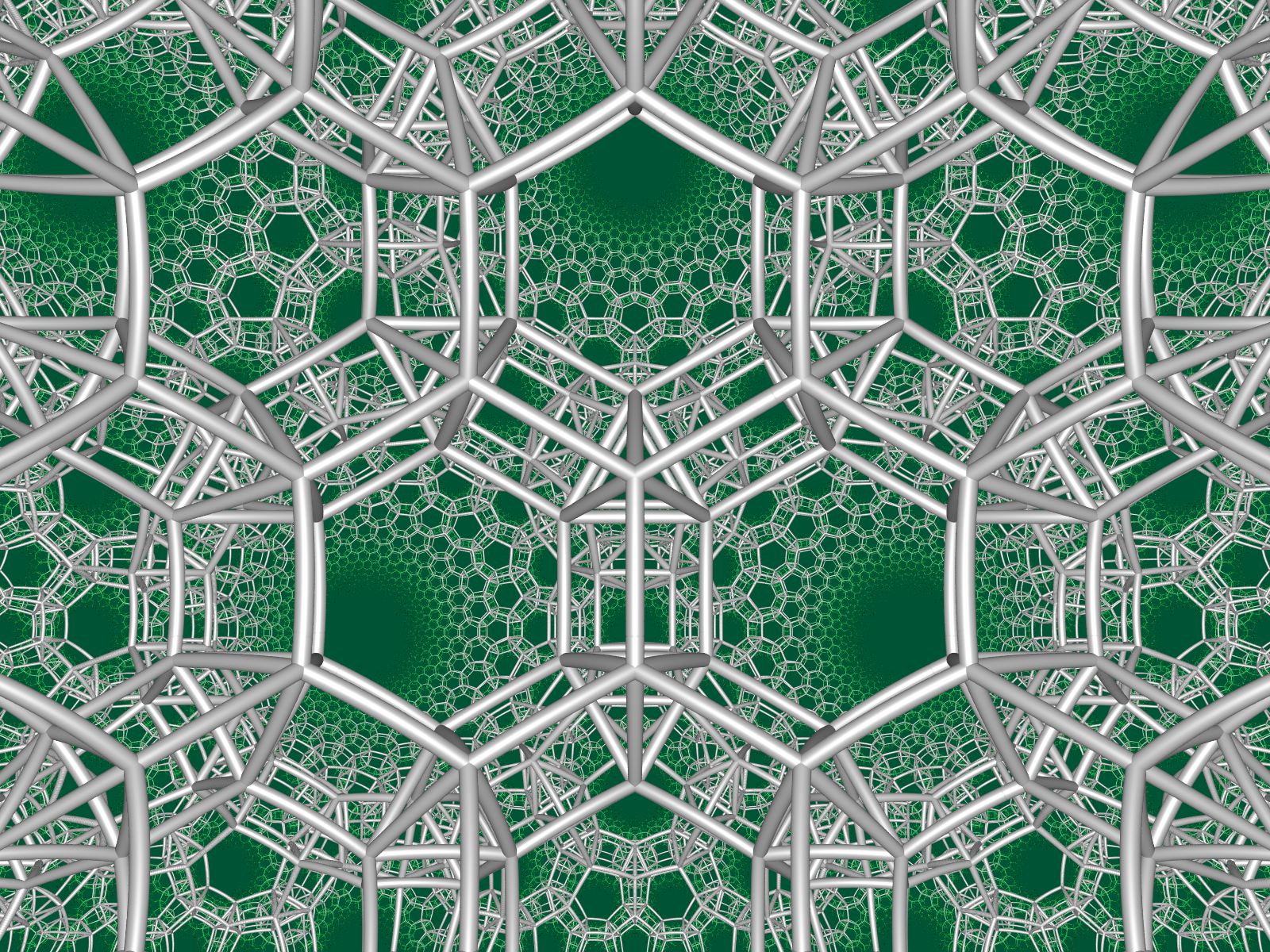

=== Runcitruncated hexagonal tiling honeycomb ===
Runcitruncated hexagonal tiling honeycomb
Type	Paracompact uniform honeycomb
Schläfli symbol	t_{0,1,3}{6,3,3}
Coxeter diagram	
Cells	rr{3,3} {}x{3} {}x{12} t{6,3}
Faces	triangle {3} square {4} dodecagon {12}
Vertex figure	isosceles-trapezoidal pyramid
Coxeter groups	${\overline{V}}_3$, [3,3,6]
Properties	Vertex-transitive

The runcitruncated hexagonal tiling honeycomb, t_{0,1,3}{6,3,3}, has cuboctahedron, triangular prism, dodecagonal prism, and truncated hexagonal tiling cells, with an isosceles-trapezoidal pyramid vertex figure.

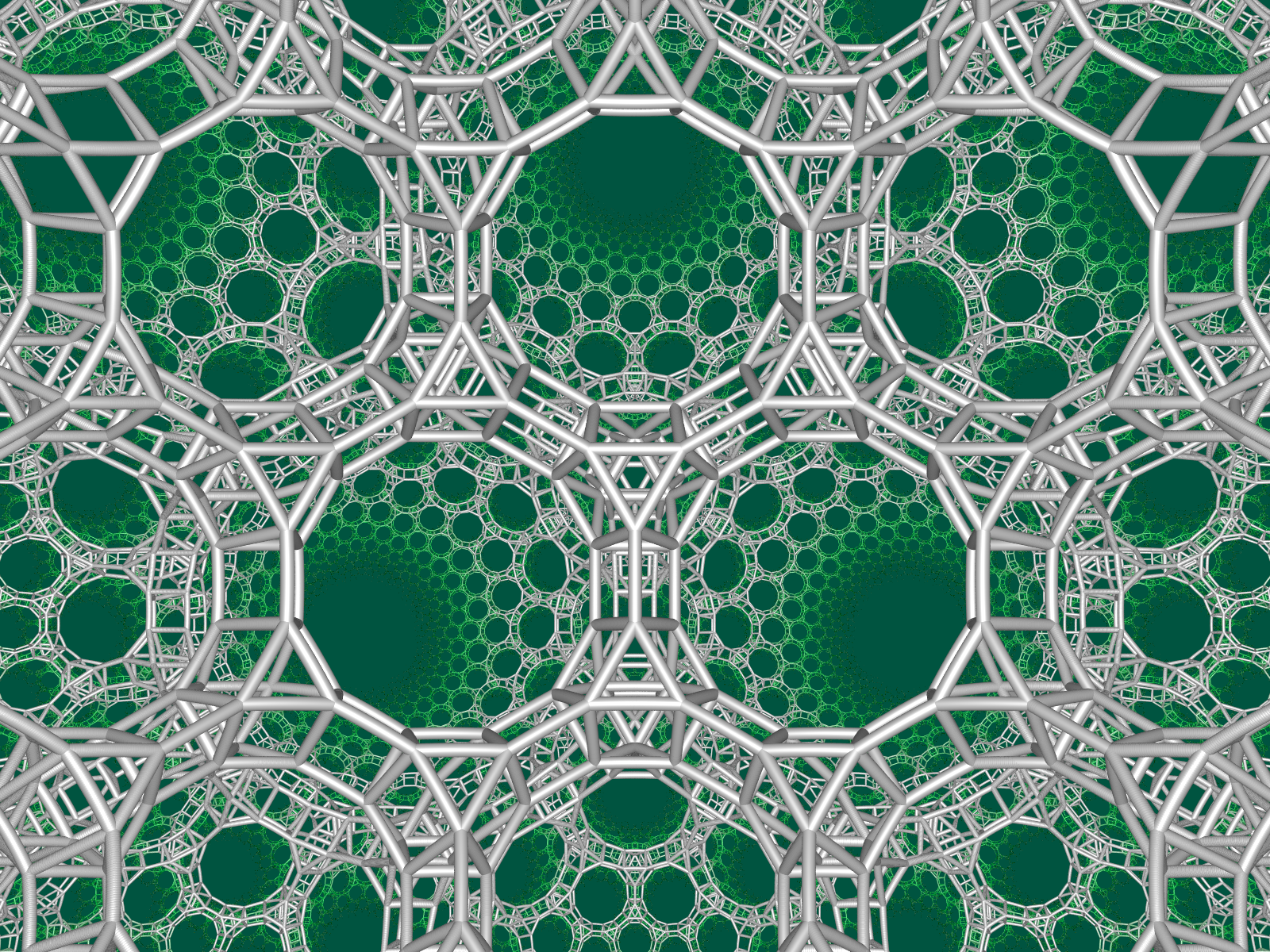

=== Runcicantellated hexagonal tiling honeycomb ===
Runcicantellated hexagonal tiling honeycomb runcitruncated order-6 tetrahedral honeycomb
Type	Paracompact uniform honeycomb
Schläfli symbol	t_{0,2,3}{6,3,3}
Coxeter diagram	
Cells	t{3,3} {}x{6} rr{6,3}
Faces	triangle {3} square {4} hexagon {6}
Vertex figure	isosceles-trapezoidal pyramid
Coxeter groups	${\overline{V}}_3$, [3,3,6]
Properties	Vertex-transitive

The runcicantellated hexagonal tiling honeycomb or runcitruncated order-6 tetrahedral honeycomb, t_{0,2,3}{6,3,3}, has truncated tetrahedron, hexagonal prism, and rhombitrihexagonal tiling cells, with an isosceles-trapezoidal pyramid vertex figure.

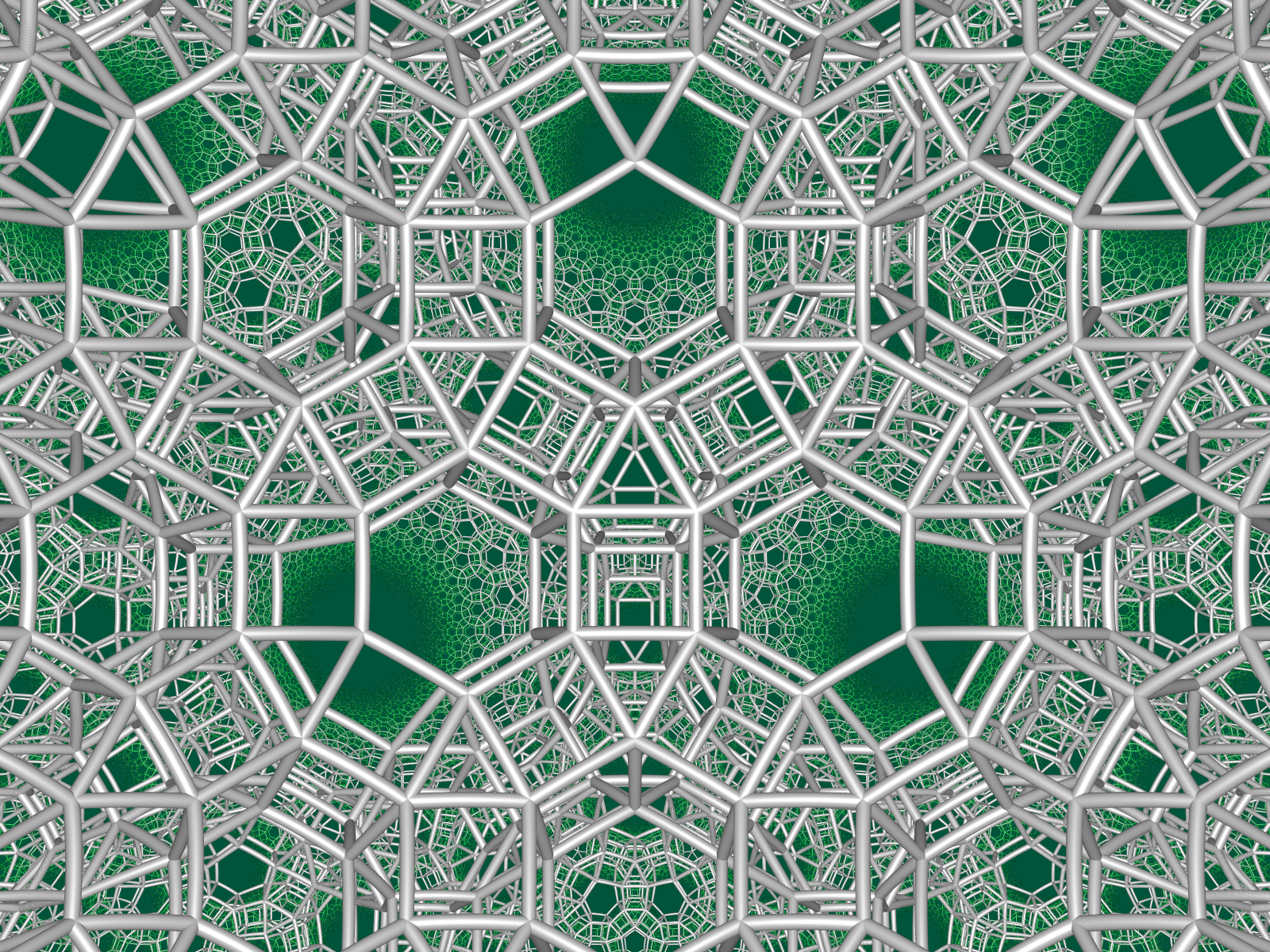

=== Omnitruncated hexagonal tiling honeycomb ===
Omnitruncated hexagonal tiling honeycomb Omnitruncated order-6 tetrahedral honeycomb
Type	Paracompact uniform honeycomb
Schläfli symbol	t_{0,1,2,3}{6,3,3}
Coxeter diagram	
Cells	tr{3,3} {}x{6} {}x{12} tr{6,3}
Faces	square {4} hexagon {6} dodecagon {12}
Vertex figure	irregular tetrahedron
Coxeter groups	${\overline{V}}_3$, [3,3,6]
Properties	Vertex-transitive

The omnitruncated hexagonal tiling honeycomb or omnitruncated order-6 tetrahedral honeycomb, t_{0,1,2,3}{6,3,3}, has truncated octahedron, hexagonal prism, dodecagonal prism, and truncated trihexagonal tiling cells, with an irregular tetrahedron vertex figure.

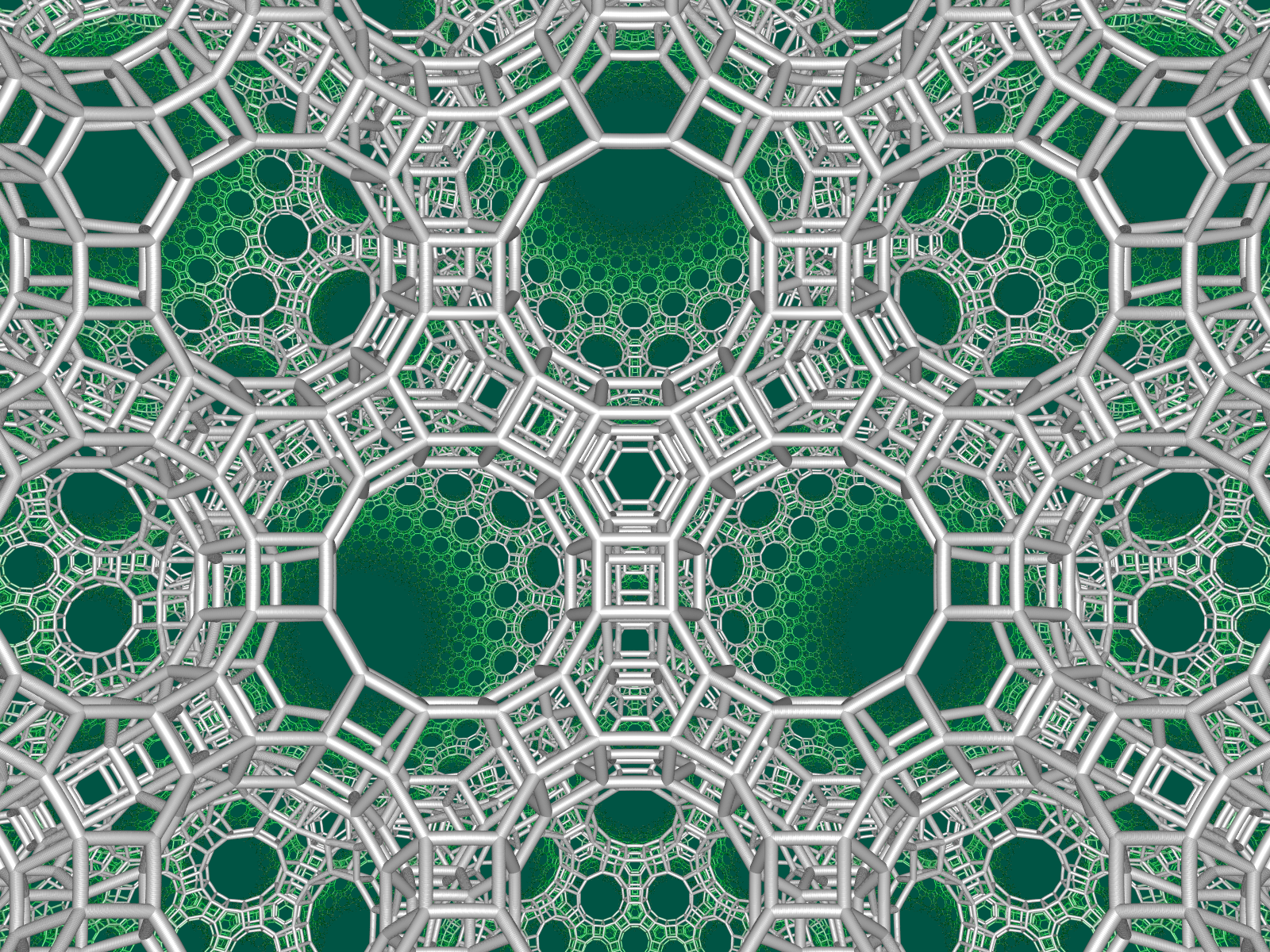

== See also ==
- Convex uniform honeycombs in hyperbolic space
- Regular tessellations of hyperbolic 3-space
- Paracompact uniform honeycombs
- Alternated hexagonal tiling honeycomb
