= Triangular tiling honeycomb =

Triangular tiling honeycomb
Type	Hyperbolic regular honeycomb Paracompact uniform honeycomb
Schläfli symbol	{3,6,3} h{6,3,6} h{6,3^{[3]}} ↔ {3^{[3,3]}}
Coxeter-Dynkin diagrams	↔ ↔ ↔
Cells	{3,6}
Faces	triangle {3}
Edge figure	triangle {3}
Vertex figure	hexagonal tiling
Dual	Self-dual
Coxeter groups	$\overline{Y}_3$, [3,6,3] $\overline{VP}_3$, [6,3^{[3]}] $\overline{PP}_3$, [3^{[3,3]}]
Properties	Regular

The triangular tiling honeycomb is one of 11 paracompact regular space-filling tessellations (or honeycombs) in hyperbolic 3-space. It is called paracompact because it has infinite cells and vertex figures, with all vertices as ideal points at infinity. It has Schläfli symbol {3,6,3}, being composed of triangular tiling cells. Each edge of the honeycomb is surrounded by three cells, and each vertex is ideal with infinitely many cells meeting there. Its vertex figure is a hexagonal tiling.

A geometric honeycomb is a space-filling of polyhedral or higher-dimensional cells, so that there are no gaps. It is an example of the more general mathematical tiling or tessellation in any number of dimensions.

Honeycombs are usually constructed in ordinary Euclidean ("flat") space, like the convex uniform honeycombs. They may also be constructed in non-Euclidean spaces, such as hyperbolic uniform honeycombs. Any finite uniform polytope can be projected to its circumsphere to form a uniform honeycomb in spherical space.

== Symmetry ==
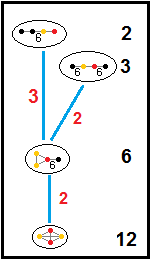
Subgroups of [3,6,3] and [6,3,6]

It has two lower reflective symmetry constructions, as an alternated order-6 hexagonal tiling honeycomb, ↔, and as from, which alternates 3 types (colors) of triangular tilings around every edge. In Coxeter notation, the removal of the 3rd and 4th mirrors, [3,6,3^{*}] creates a new Coxeter group [3^{[3,3]}],, subgroup index 6. The fundamental domain is 6 times larger. By Coxeter diagram there are 3 copies of the first original mirror in the new fundamental domain: ↔.

== Related tilings ==
It is similar to the 2D hyperbolic infinite-order apeirogonal tiling, {∞,∞}, with infinite apeirogonal faces, and with all vertices on the ideal surface.

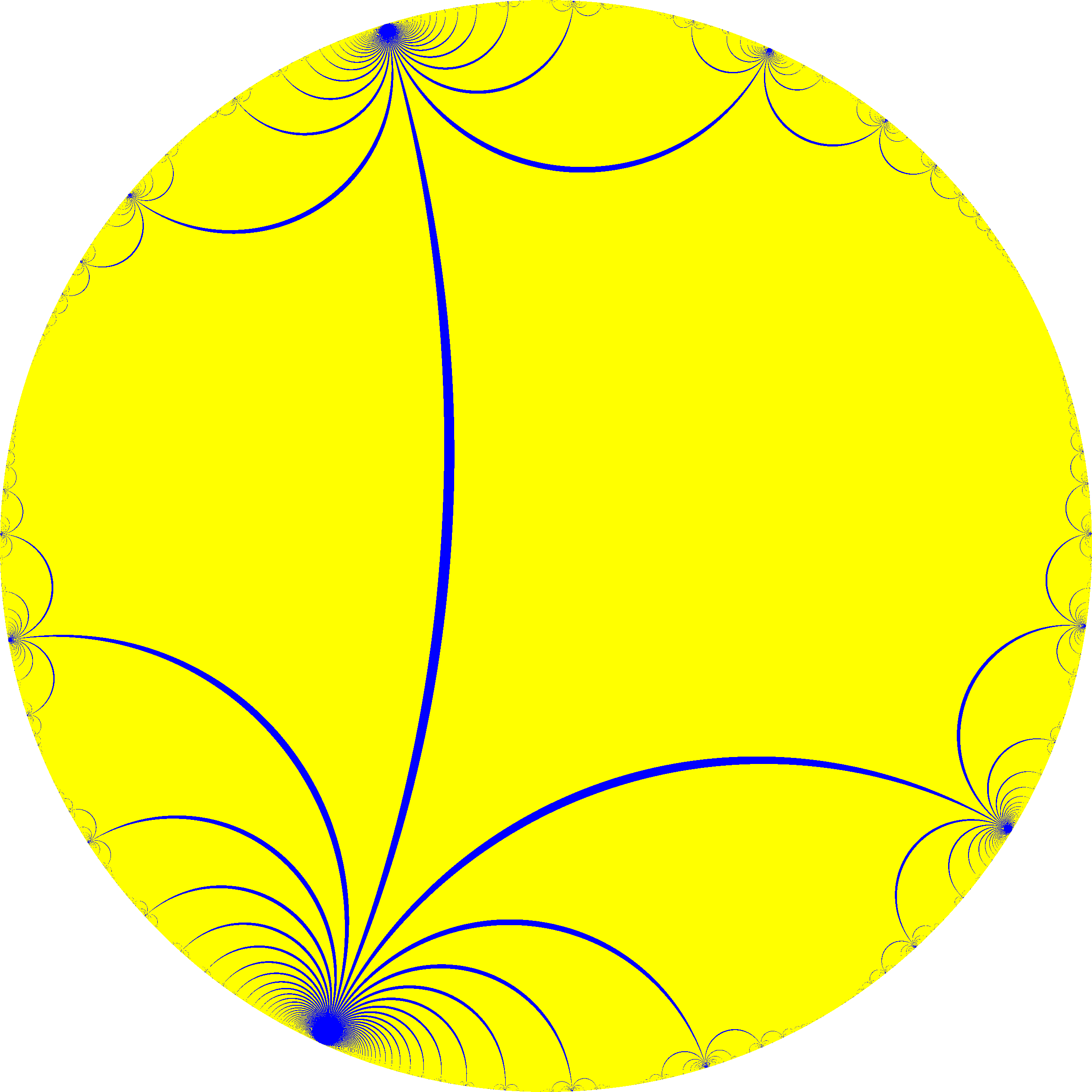

== Related honeycombs ==
The triangular tiling honeycomb is a regular hyperbolic honeycomb in 3-space, and one of eleven paracompact honeycombs.

11 paracompact regular honeycombs
{6,3,3}	{6,3,4}	{6,3,5}	{6,3,6}	{4,4,3}	{4,4,4}
{3,3,6}	{4,3,6}	{5,3,6}	{3,6,3}	{3,4,4}	

There are nine uniform honeycombs in the [3,6,3] Coxeter group family, including this regular form as well as the bitruncated form, t_{1,2}{3,6,3}, with all truncated hexagonal tiling facets.

[3,6,3] family honeycombs
{3,6,3}	r{3,6,3}	t{3,6,3}	rr{3,6,3}	t_{0,3}{3,6,3}	2t{3,6,3}	tr{3,6,3}	t_{0,1,3}{3,6,3}	t_{0,1,2,3}{3,6,3}

The honeycomb is also part of a series of polychora and honeycombs with triangular edge figures.

{3,p,3} polytopes
Space	S^{3}		H^{3}				
Form	Finite		Compact	Paracompact	Noncompact		
{3,p,3}	{3,3,3}	{3,4,3}	{3,5,3}	{3,6,3}	{3,7,3}	{3,8,3}	... {3,∞,3}
Image							
Cells	{3,3}	{3,4}	{3,5}	{3,6}	{3,7}	{3,8}	{3,∞}
Vertex figure	{3,3}	{4,3}	{5,3}	{6,3}	{7,3}	{8,3}	{∞,3}

=== Rectified triangular tiling honeycomb ===
Rectified triangular tiling honeycomb
Type	Paracompact uniform honeycomb
Schläfli symbol	r{3,6,3} h_{2}{6,3,6}
Coxeter diagram	↔ ↔ ↔
Cells	r{3,6}, {6,3}
Faces	triangle {3} hexagon {6}
Vertex figure	triangular prism
Coxeter group	$\overline{Y}_3$, [3,6,3] $\overline{VP}_3$, [6,3^{[3]}] $\overline{PP}_3$, [3^{[3,3]}]
Properties	Vertex-transitive, edge-transitive

The rectified triangular tiling honeycomb,, has trihexagonal tiling and hexagonal tiling cells, with a triangular prism vertex figure.

==== Symmetry ====
A lower symmetry of this honeycomb can be constructed as a cantic order-6 hexagonal tiling honeycomb, ↔. A second lower-index construction is ↔.

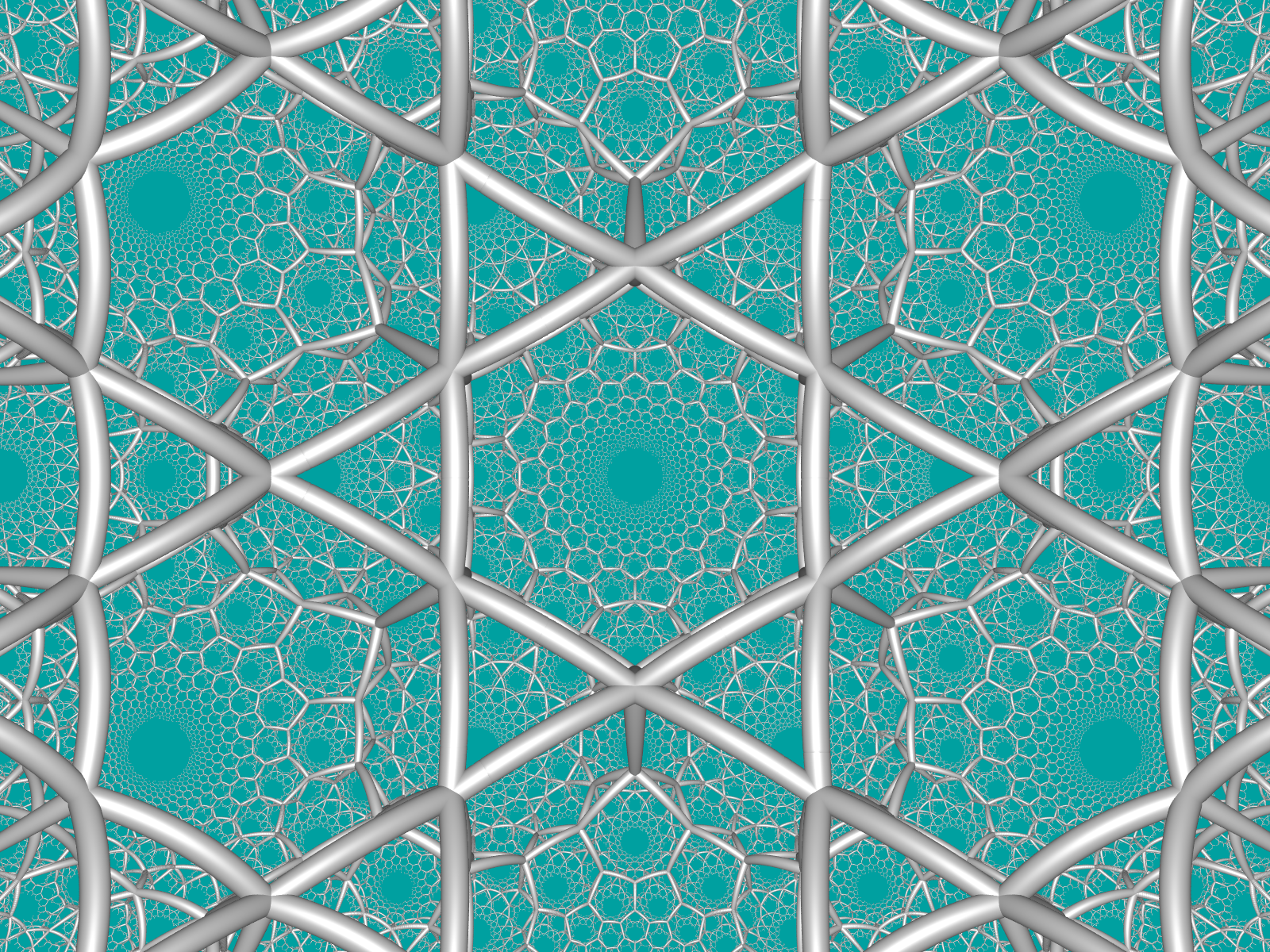

=== Truncated triangular tiling honeycomb ===
Truncated triangular tiling honeycomb
Type	Paracompact uniform honeycomb
Schläfli symbol	t{3,6,3}
Coxeter diagram	
Cells	t{3,6}, {6,3}
Faces	hexagon {6}
Vertex figure	tetrahedron
Coxeter group	$\overline{Y}_3$, [3,6,3] $\overline{V}_3$, [3,3,6]
Properties	Regular

The truncated triangular tiling honeycomb,, is a lower-symmetry form of the hexagonal tiling honeycomb,. It contains hexagonal tiling facets with a tetrahedral vertex figure.

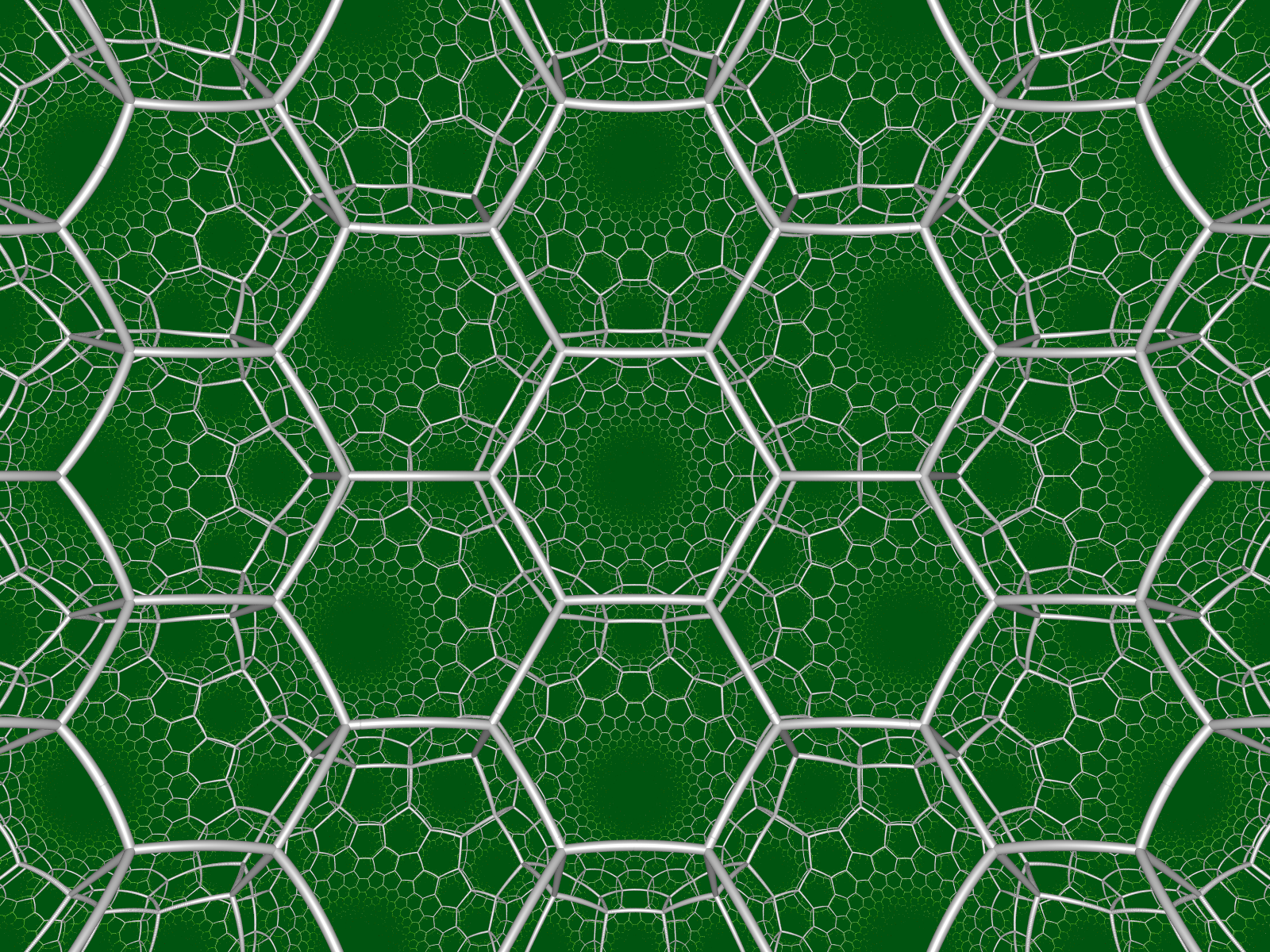

=== Bitruncated triangular tiling honeycomb ===
Bitruncated triangular tiling honeycomb
Type	Paracompact uniform honeycomb
Schläfli symbol	2t{3,6,3}
Coxeter diagram	
Cells	t{6,3}
Faces	triangle {3} dodecagon {12}
Vertex figure	tetragonal disphenoid
Coxeter group	$2\times\overline{Y}_3$, [[3,6,3]]
Properties	Vertex-transitive, edge-transitive, cell-transitive

The bitruncated triangular tiling honeycomb,, has truncated hexagonal tiling cells, with a tetragonal disphenoid vertex figure.

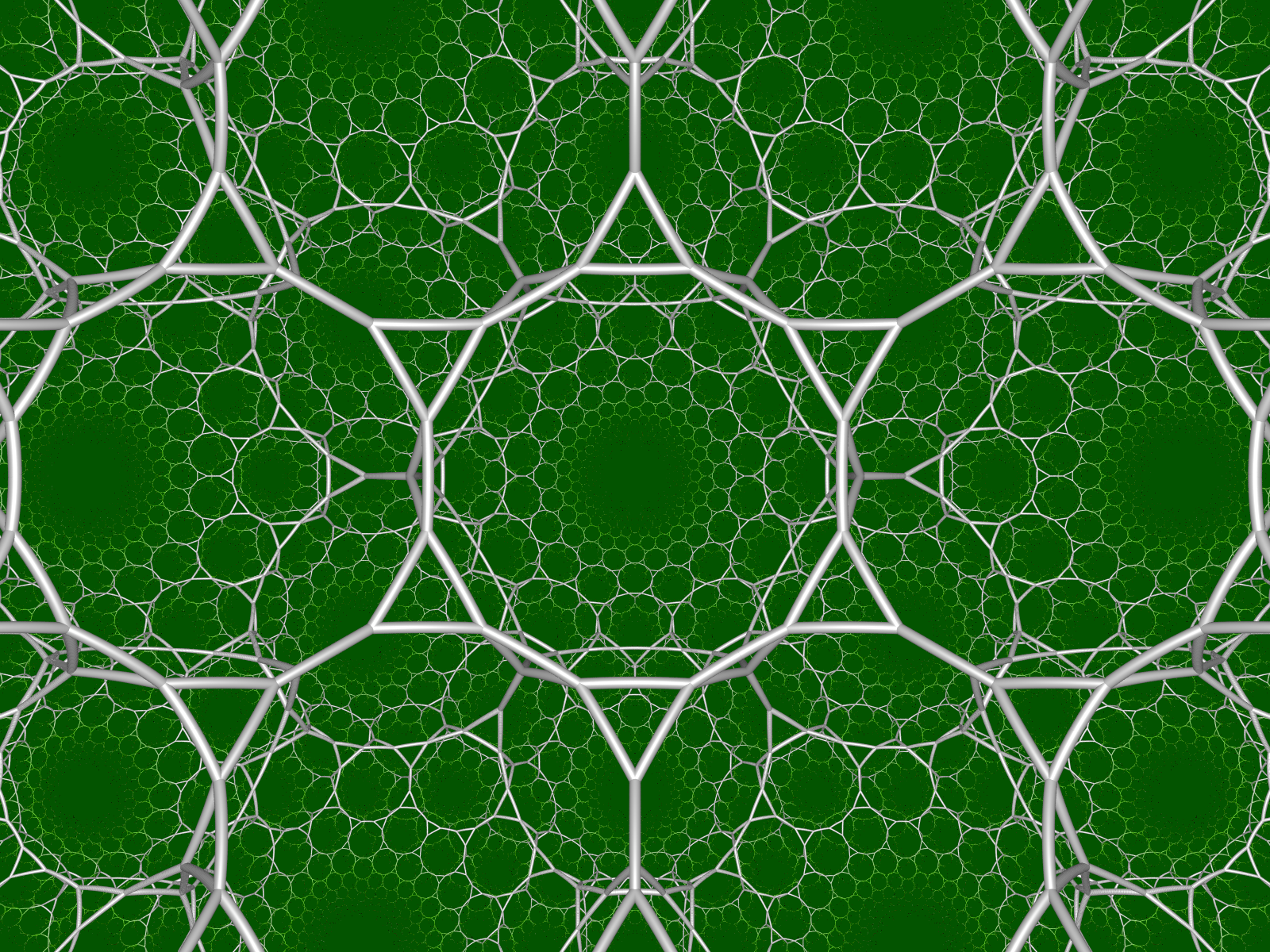

=== Cantellated triangular tiling honeycomb ===
Cantellated triangular tiling honeycomb
Type	Paracompact uniform honeycomb
Schläfli symbol	rr{3,6,3} or t_{0,2}{3,6,3} s_{2}{3,6,3}
Coxeter diagram	
Cells	rr{6,3}, r{6,3} {}×{3}
Faces	triangle {3} square {4} hexagon {6}
Vertex figure	wedge
Coxeter group	$\overline{Y}_3$, [3,6,3]
Properties	Vertex-transitive

The cantellated triangular tiling honeycomb,, has rhombitrihexagonal tiling, trihexagonal tiling, and triangular prism cells, with a wedge vertex figure.

==== Symmetry ====
It can also be constructed as a cantic snub triangular tiling honeycomb,, a half-symmetry form with symmetry [3^{+},6,3].

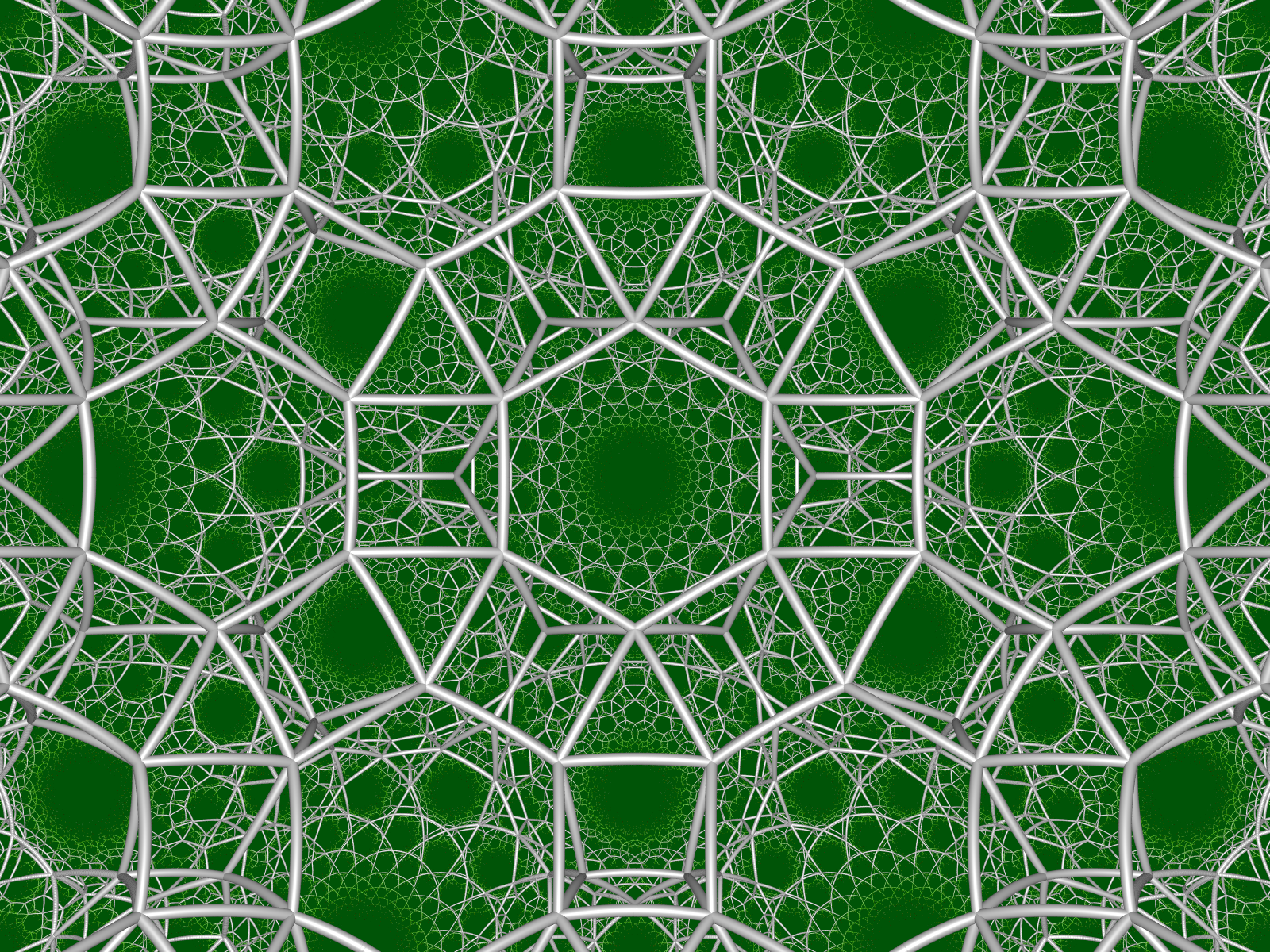

=== Cantitruncated triangular tiling honeycomb ===
Cantitruncated triangular tiling honeycomb
Type	Paracompact uniform honeycomb
Schläfli symbol	tr{3,6,3} or t_{0,1,2}{3,6,3}
Coxeter diagram	
Cells	tr{6,3}, t{6,3} {}×{3}
Faces	triangle {3} square {4} hexagon {6} dodecagon {12}
Vertex figure	mirrored sphenoid
Coxeter group	$\overline{Y}_3$, [3,6,3]
Properties	Vertex-transitive

The cantitruncated triangular tiling honeycomb,, has truncated trihexagonal tiling, truncated hexagonal tiling, and triangular prism cells, with a mirrored sphenoid vertex figure.

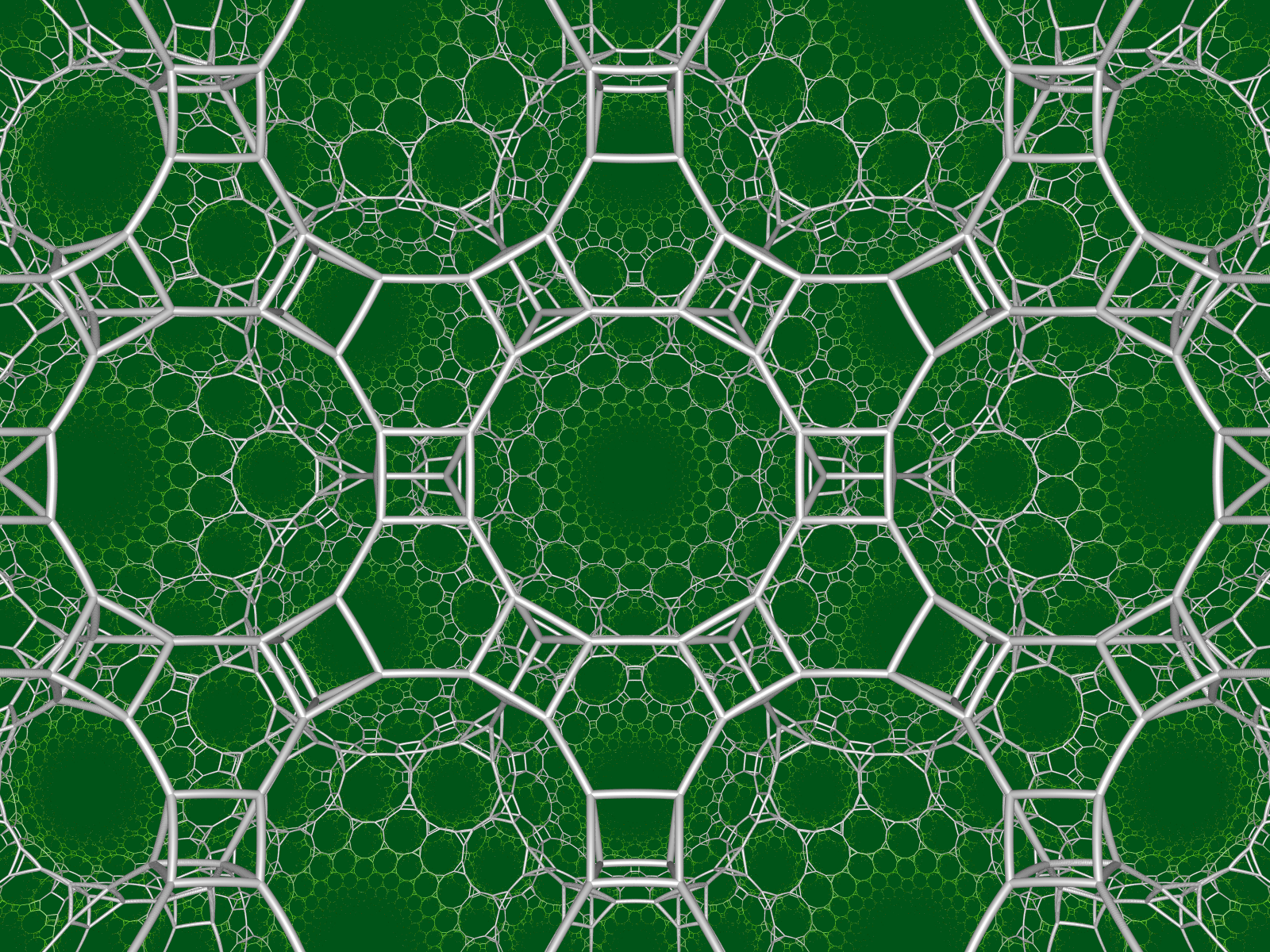

=== Runcinated triangular tiling honeycomb ===
Runcinated triangular tiling honeycomb
Type	Paracompact uniform honeycomb
Schläfli symbol	t_{0,3}{3,6,3}
Coxeter diagram	
Cells	{3,6} {}×{3}
Faces	triangle {3} square {4}
Vertex figure	hexagonal antiprism
Coxeter group	$2\times\overline{Y}_3$, [[3,6,3]]
Properties	Vertex-transitive, edge-transitive

The runcinated triangular tiling honeycomb,, has triangular tiling and triangular prism cells, with a hexagonal antiprism vertex figure.

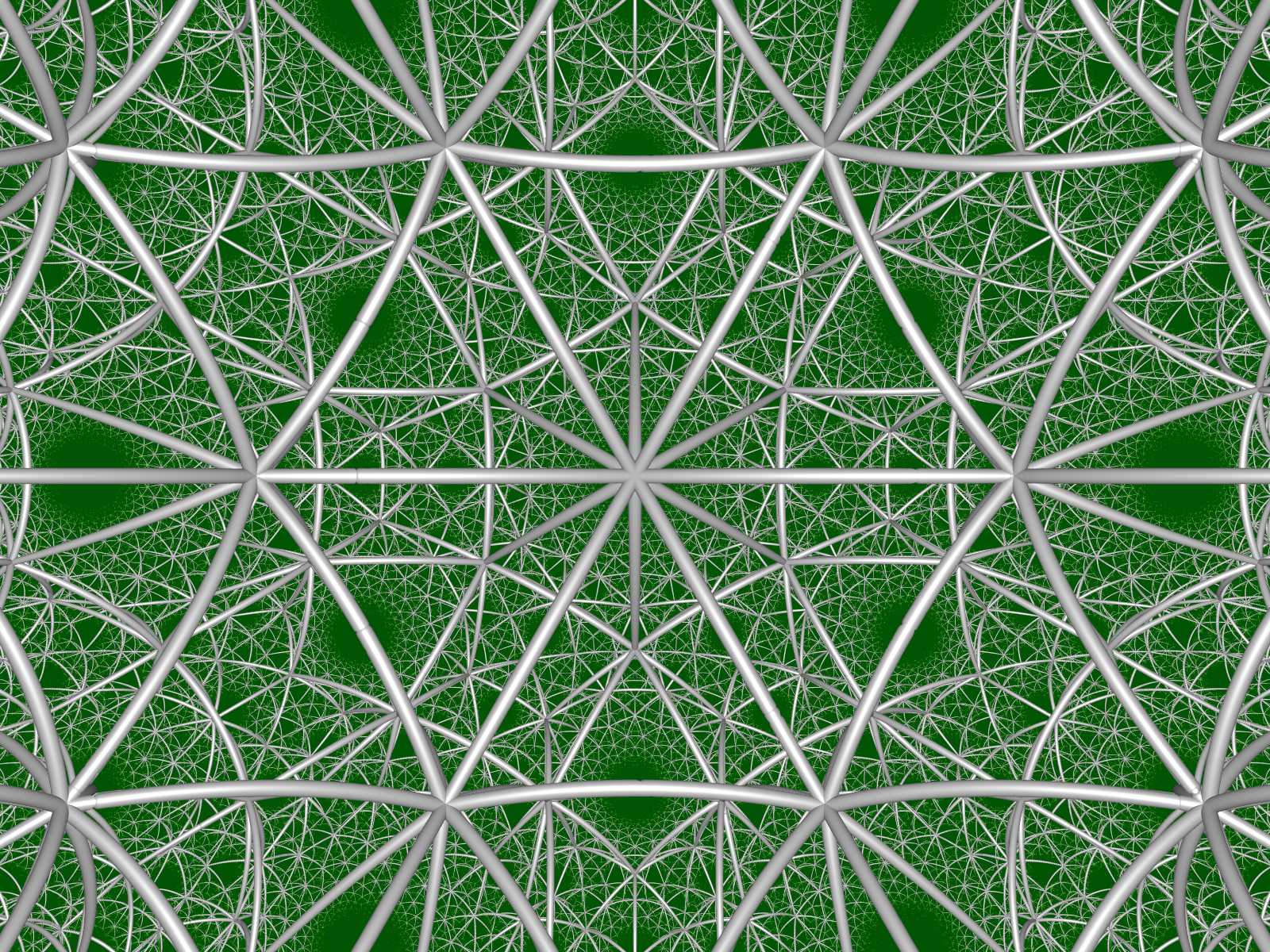

=== Runcitruncated triangular tiling honeycomb ===
Runcitruncated triangular tiling honeycomb
Type	Paracompact uniform honeycomb
Schläfli symbols	t_{0,1,3}{3,6,3} s_{2,3}{3,6,3}
Coxeter diagrams	
Cells	t{3,6}, rr{3,6} {}×{3} {}×{6}
Faces	triangle {3} square {4} hexagon {6}
Vertex figure	isosceles-trapezoidal pyramid
Coxeter group	$\overline{Y}_3$, [3,6,3]
Properties	Vertex-transitive

The runcitruncated triangular tiling honeycomb,, has hexagonal tiling, rhombitrihexagonal tiling, triangular prism, and hexagonal prism cells, with an isosceles-trapezoidal pyramid vertex figure.

==== Symmetry ====
It can also be constructed as a runcicantic snub triangular tiling honeycomb,, a half-symmetry form with symmetry [3^{+},6,3].

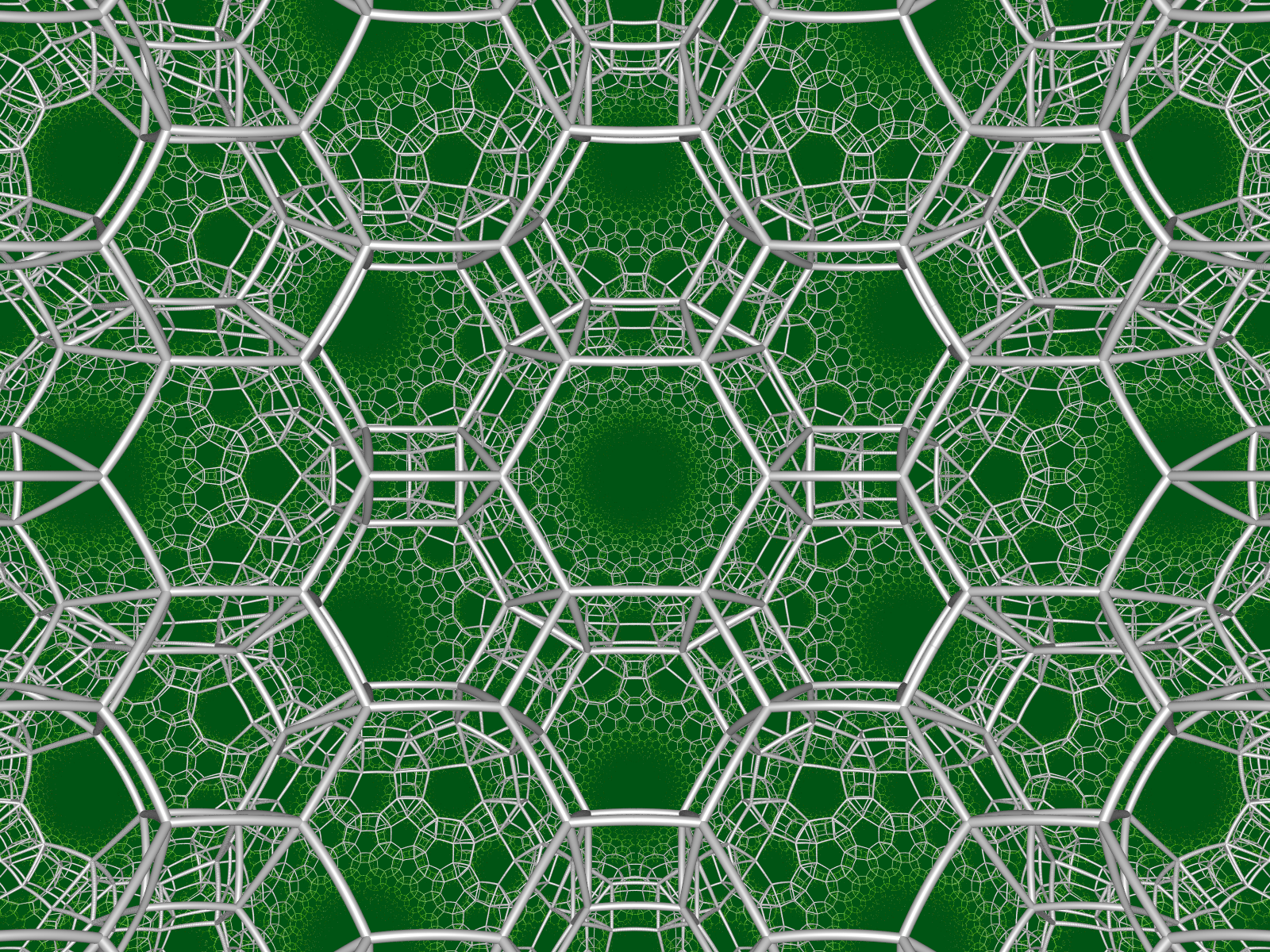

=== Omnitruncated triangular tiling honeycomb ===
Omnitruncated triangular tiling honeycomb
Type	Paracompact uniform honeycomb
Schläfli symbol	t_{0,1,2,3}{3,6,3}
Coxeter diagram	
Cells	tr{3,6} {}×{6}
Faces	square {4} hexagon {6} dodecagon {12}
Vertex figure	phyllic disphenoid
Coxeter group	$2\times\overline{Y}_3$, [[3,6,3]]
Properties	Vertex-transitive, edge-transitive

The omnitruncated triangular tiling honeycomb,, has truncated trihexagonal tiling and hexagonal prism cells, with a phyllic disphenoid vertex figure.

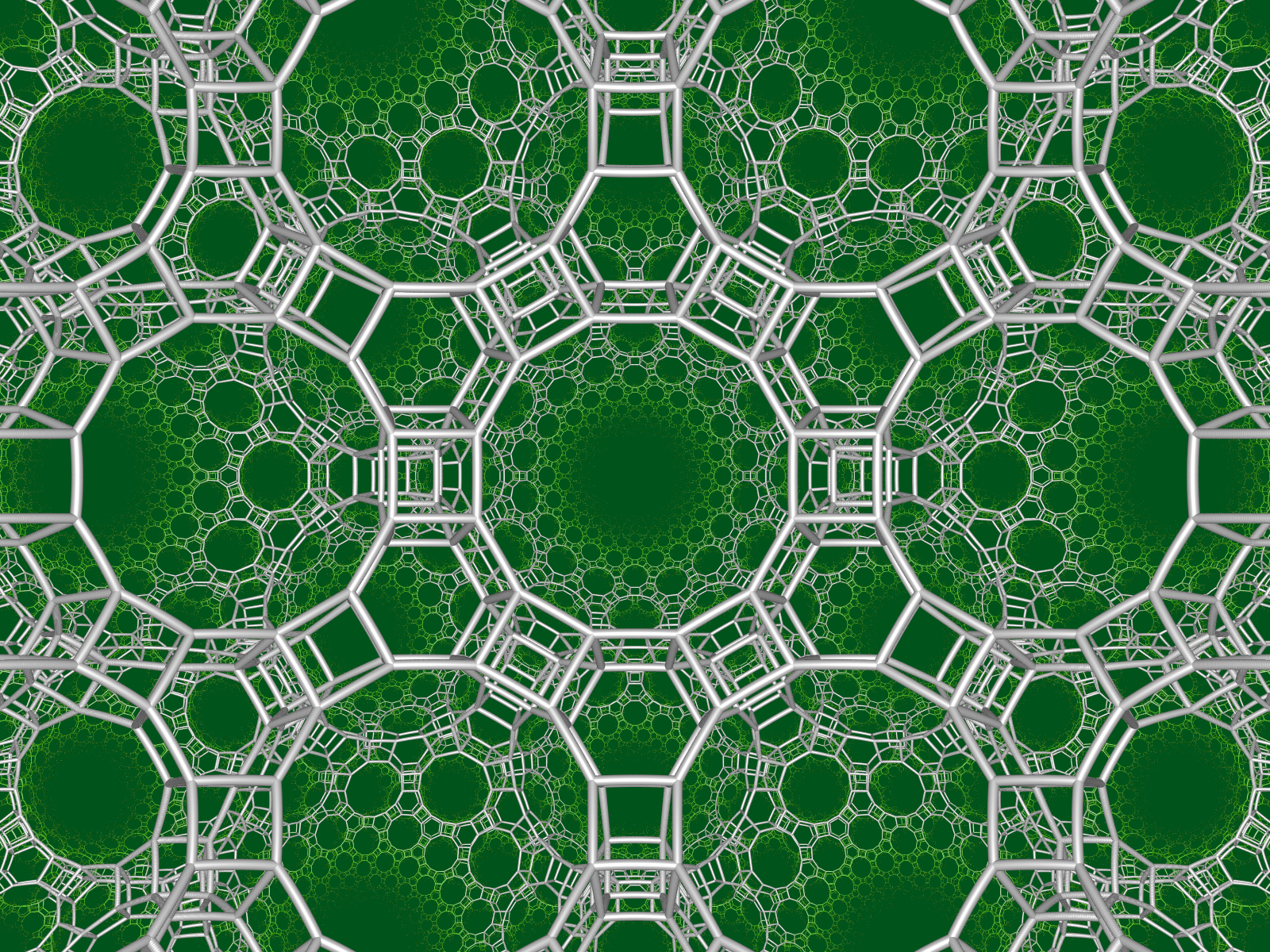

=== Runcisnub triangular tiling honeycomb ===
Runcisnub triangular tiling honeycomb
Type	Paracompact scaliform honeycomb
Schläfli symbol	s_{3}{3,6,3}
Coxeter diagram	
Cells	r{6,3} {}x{3} {3,6} tricup
Faces	triangle {3} square {4} hexagon {6}
Vertex figure	
Coxeter group	$\overline{Y}_3$, [3^{+},6,3]
Properties	Vertex-transitive, non-uniform

The runcisnub triangular tiling honeycomb,, has trihexagonal tiling, triangular tiling, triangular prism, and triangular cupola cells. It is vertex-transitive, but not uniform, since it contains Johnson solid triangular cupola cells.

== See also ==
- Convex uniform honeycombs in hyperbolic space
- Regular tessellations of hyperbolic 3-space
- Paracompact uniform honeycombs
