= Horosphere =

Hypersurface in hyperbolic space

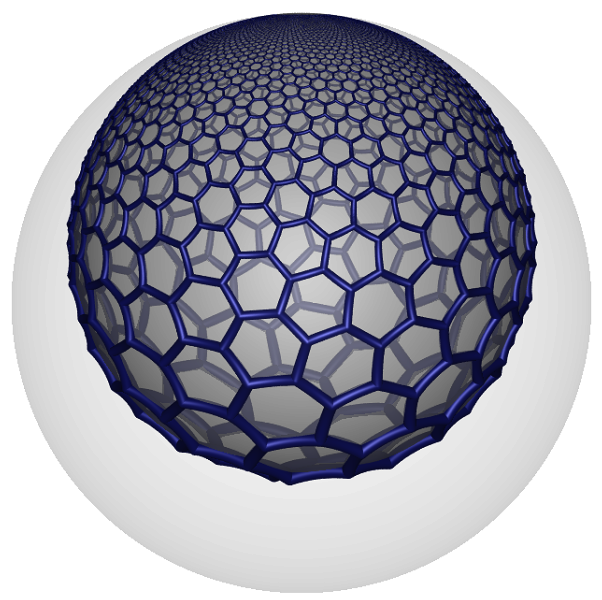
A horosphere within the Poincaré disk model tangent to the edges of a hexagonal tiling cell of a hexagonal tiling honeycomb

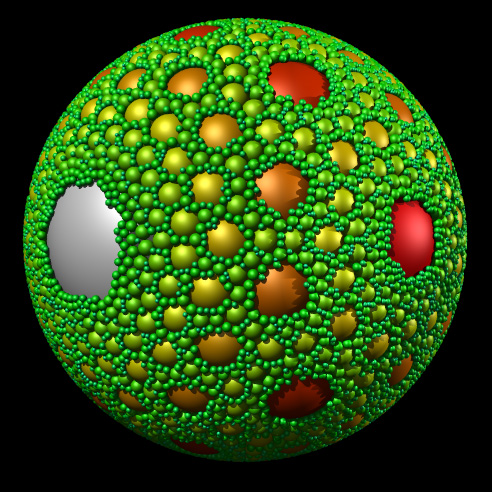
Apollonian sphere packing can be seen as showing horospheres that are tangent to an outer sphere of a Poincaré disk model

In hyperbolic geometry, a horosphere (or parasphere) is a specific hypersurface in hyperbolic n-space. It is the boundary of a horoball, the limit of a sequence of increasing balls sharing (on one side) a tangent hyperplane and its point of tangency. For n = 2 a horosphere is called a horocycle.

A horosphere can also be described as the limit of the hyperspheres that share a tangent hyperplane at a given point, as their radii go towards infinity. In Euclidean geometry, such a "hypersphere of infinite radius" would be a hyperplane, but in hyperbolic geometry it is a horosphere (a curved surface).

== History ==
The concept has its roots in a notion expressed by F. L. Wachter in 1816 in a letter to his teacher Gauss. Noting that in Euclidean geometry the limit of a sphere as its radius tends to infinity is a plane, Wachter affirmed that even if the fifth postulate were false, there would nevertheless be a geometry on the surface identical with that of the ordinary plane. The terms horosphere and horocycle are due to Lobachevsky, who established various results showing that the geometry of horocycles and the horosphere in hyperbolic space were equivalent to those of lines and the plane in Euclidean space. The term "horoball" is due to William Thurston, who used it in his work on hyperbolic 3-manifolds. The terms horosphere and horoball are often used in 3-dimensional hyperbolic geometry.

== Models ==
In the conformal ball model, a horosphere is represented by a sphere tangent to the horizon sphere. In the upper half-space model, a horosphere can appear either as a sphere tangent to the horizon plane, or as a plane parallel to the horizon plane. In the hyperboloid model, a horosphere is represented by a plane whose normal lies in the asymptotic cone.

== Curvature ==
A horosphere has a critical amount of (isotropic) curvature: if the curvature were any greater, the surface would close, yielding a sphere, and if the curvature were any less, the surface would be an (N − 1)-dimensional hypercycle.
