= Order-6 dodecahedral honeycomb =

Regular geometrical object in hyperbolic space

Order-6 dodecahedral honeycomb
Perspective projection view within Poincaré disk model
| Type | Hyperbolic regular honeycomb Paracompact uniform honeycomb |
| Schläfli symbol | {5,3,6} {5,3^{[3]}} |
| Coxeter diagram | ↔ |
| Cells | {5,3} |
| Faces | pentagon {5} |
| Edge figure | hexagon {6} |
| Vertex figure | triangular tiling |
| Dual | Order-5 hexagonal tiling honeycomb |
| Coxeter group | $\overline{HV}_3$, [5,3,6] $\overline{HP}_3$, [5,3^{[3]}] |
| Properties | Regular, quasiregular |

The order-6 dodecahedral honeycomb is one of 11 paracompact regular honeycombs in hyperbolic 3-space. It is paracompact because it has vertex figures composed of an infinite number of faces, with all vertices as ideal points at infinity. It has Schläfli symbol {5,3,6}, with six ideal dodecahedral cells surrounding each edge of the honeycomb. Each vertex is ideal, and surrounded by infinitely many dodecahedra. The honeycomb has a triangular tiling vertex figure.

A geometric honeycomb is a space-filling of polyhedral or higher-dimensional cells, so that there are no gaps. It is an example of the more general mathematical tiling or tessellation in any number of dimensions.

Honeycombs are usually constructed in ordinary Euclidean ("flat") space, like the convex uniform honeycombs. They may also be constructed in non-Euclidean spaces, such as hyperbolic uniform honeycombs. Any finite uniform polytope can be projected to its circumsphere to form a uniform honeycomb in spherical space.

== Symmetry ==
A half symmetry construction exists as with alternately colored dodecahedral cells.

== Images ==
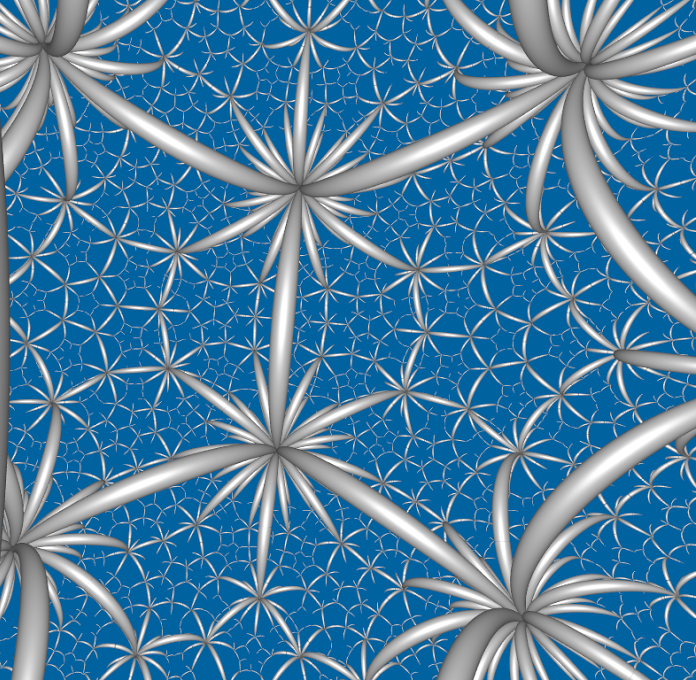
The model is cell-centered within the Poincaré disk model, with the viewpoint then placed at the origin.

The order-6 dodecahedral honeycomb is similar to the 2D hyperbolic infinite-order pentagonal tiling, {5,∞}, with pentagonal faces, and with vertices on the ideal surface.

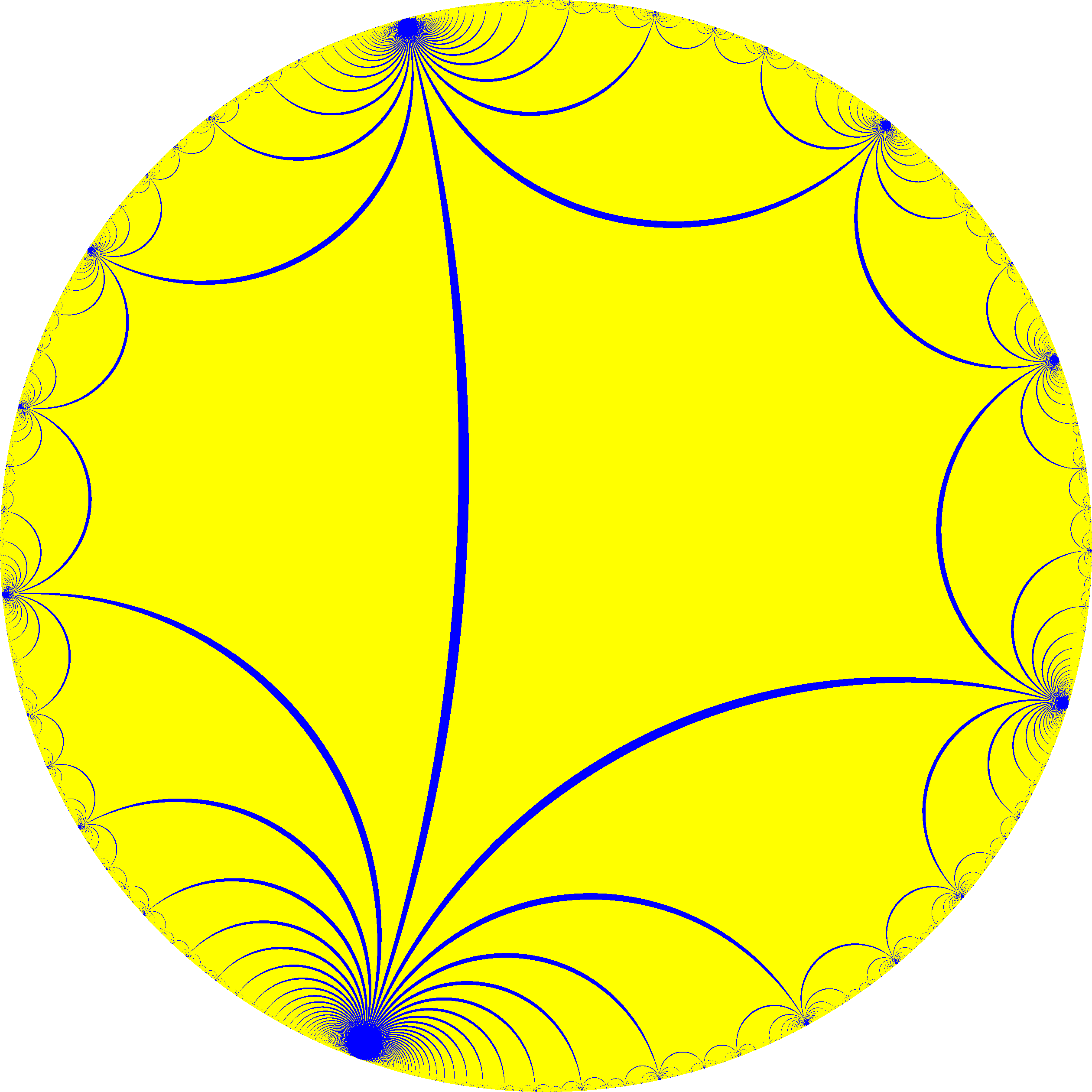

== Related polytopes and honeycombs ==
The order-6 dodecahedral honeycomb is a regular hyperbolic honeycomb in 3-space, and one of 11 which are paracompact.

11 paracompact regular honeycombs
| {6,3,3} | {6,3,4} | {6,3,5} | {6,3,6} | {4,4,3} | {4,4,4} |
| {3,3,6} | {4,3,6} | {5,3,6} | {3,6,3} | {3,4,4} | |

There are 15 uniform honeycombs in the [5,3,6] Coxeter group family, including this regular form, and its regular dual, the order-5 hexagonal tiling honeycomb.

[6,3,5] family honeycombs
| {6,3,5} | r{6,3,5} | t{6,3,5} | rr{6,3,5} | t_{0,3}{6,3,5} | tr{6,3,5} | t_{0,1,3}{6,3,5} | t_{0,1,2,3}{6,3,5} |
| {5,3,6} | r{5,3,6} | t{5,3,6} | rr{5,3,6} | 2t{5,3,6} | tr{5,3,6} | t_{0,1,3}{5,3,6} | t_{0,1,2,3}{5,3,6} |

The order-6 dodecahedral honeycomb is part of a sequence of regular polychora and honeycombs with triangular tiling vertex figures:

Hyperbolic uniform honeycombs: {p,3,6}
| Form | Paracompact | | | | Noncompact | | |
| Name | {3,3,6} | {4,3,6} | {5,3,6} | {6,3,6} | {7,3,6} | {8,3,6} | ... {∞,3,6} |
|---|---|---|---|---|---|---|---|
| Image | | | | | | | |
| Cells | {3,3} | {4,3} | {5,3} | {6,3} | {7,3} | {8,3} | {∞,3} |

It is also part of a sequence of regular polytopes and honeycombs with dodecahedral cells:

{5,3,p} polytopes
| Space | S^{3} | H^{3} | | | | | |
| Form | Finite | Compact | | Paracompact | Noncompact | | |
| Name | {5,3,3} | {5,3,4} | {5,3,5} | {5,3,6} | {5,3,7} | {5,3,8} | ... {5,3,∞} |
|---|---|---|---|---|---|---|---|
| Image | | | | | | | |
| Vertex figure | {3,3} | {3,4} | {3,5} | {3,6} | {3,7} | {3,8} | {3,∞} |

=== Rectified order-6 dodecahedral honeycomb ===
Rectified order-6 dodecahedral honeycomb
| Type | Paracompact uniform honeycomb |
| Schläfli symbols | r{5,3,6} t_{1}{5,3,6} |
| Coxeter diagrams | ↔ |
| Cells | r{5,3} {3,6} |
| Faces | triangle {3} pentagon {5} |
| Vertex figure | hexagonal prism |
| Coxeter groups | $\overline{HV}_3$, [5,3,6] $\overline{HP}_3$, [5,3^{[3]}] |
| Properties | Vertex-transitive, edge-transitive |

The rectified order-6 dodecahedral honeycomb, t_{1}{5,3,6} has icosidodecahedron and triangular tiling cells connected in a hexagonal prism vertex figure.

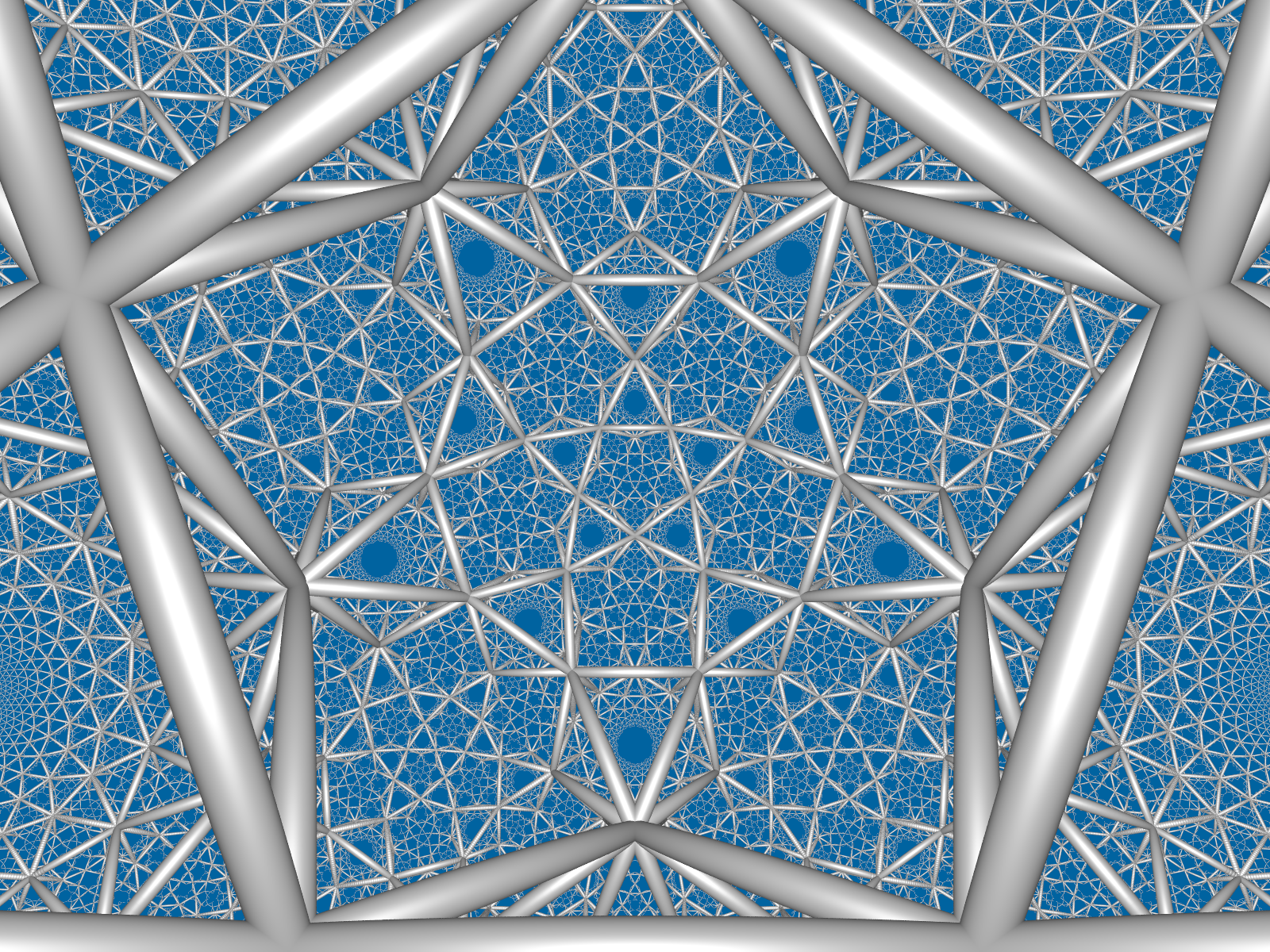
Perspective projection view within Poincaré disk model

It is similar to the 2D hyperbolic pentaapeirogonal tiling, r{5,∞} with pentagon and apeirogonal faces.

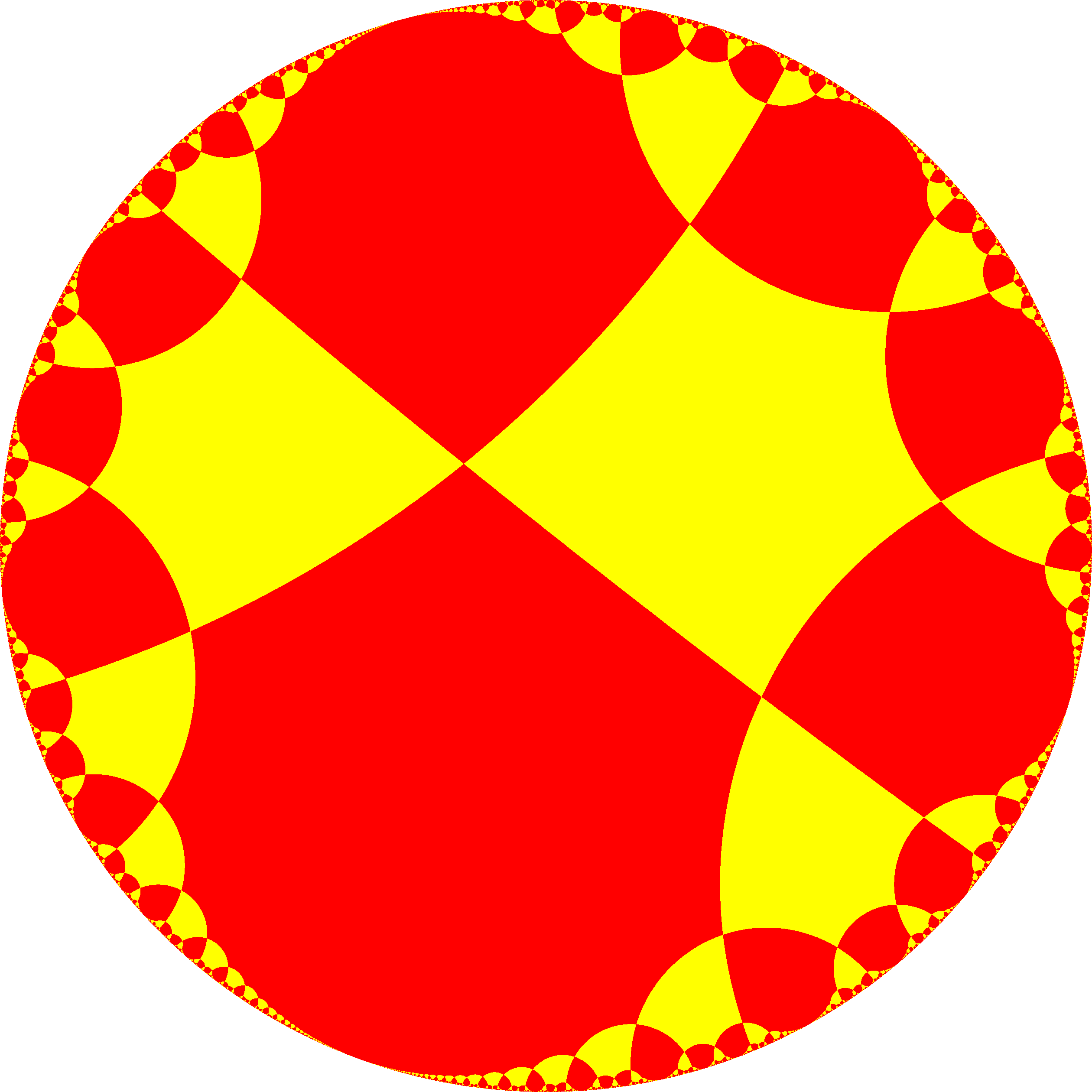

r{p,3,6}
| Space | H^{3} | | | | | |
| Form | Paracompact | | | | Noncompact | |
| Name | r{3,3,6} | r{4,3,6} | r{5,3,6} | r{6,3,6} | r{7,3,6} | ... r{∞,3,6} |
|---|---|---|---|---|---|---|
| Image | | | | | | |
| Cells {3,6} | r{3,3} | r{4,3} | r{5,3} | r{6,3} | r{7,3} | r{∞,3} |

=== Truncated order-6 dodecahedral honeycomb ===
Truncated order-6 dodecahedral honeycomb
| Type | Paracompact uniform honeycomb |
| Schläfli symbols | t{5,3,6} t_{0,1}{5,3,6} |
| Coxeter diagrams | ↔ |
| Cells | t{5,3} {3,6} |
| Faces | triangle {3} decagon {10} |
| Vertex figure | hexagonal pyramid |
| Coxeter groups | $\overline{HV}_3$, [5,3,6] $\overline{HP}_3$, [5,3^{[3]}] |
| Properties | Vertex-transitive |

The truncated order-6 dodecahedral honeycomb, t_{0,1}{5,3,6} has truncated dodecahedron and triangular tiling cells connected in a hexagonal pyramid vertex figure.

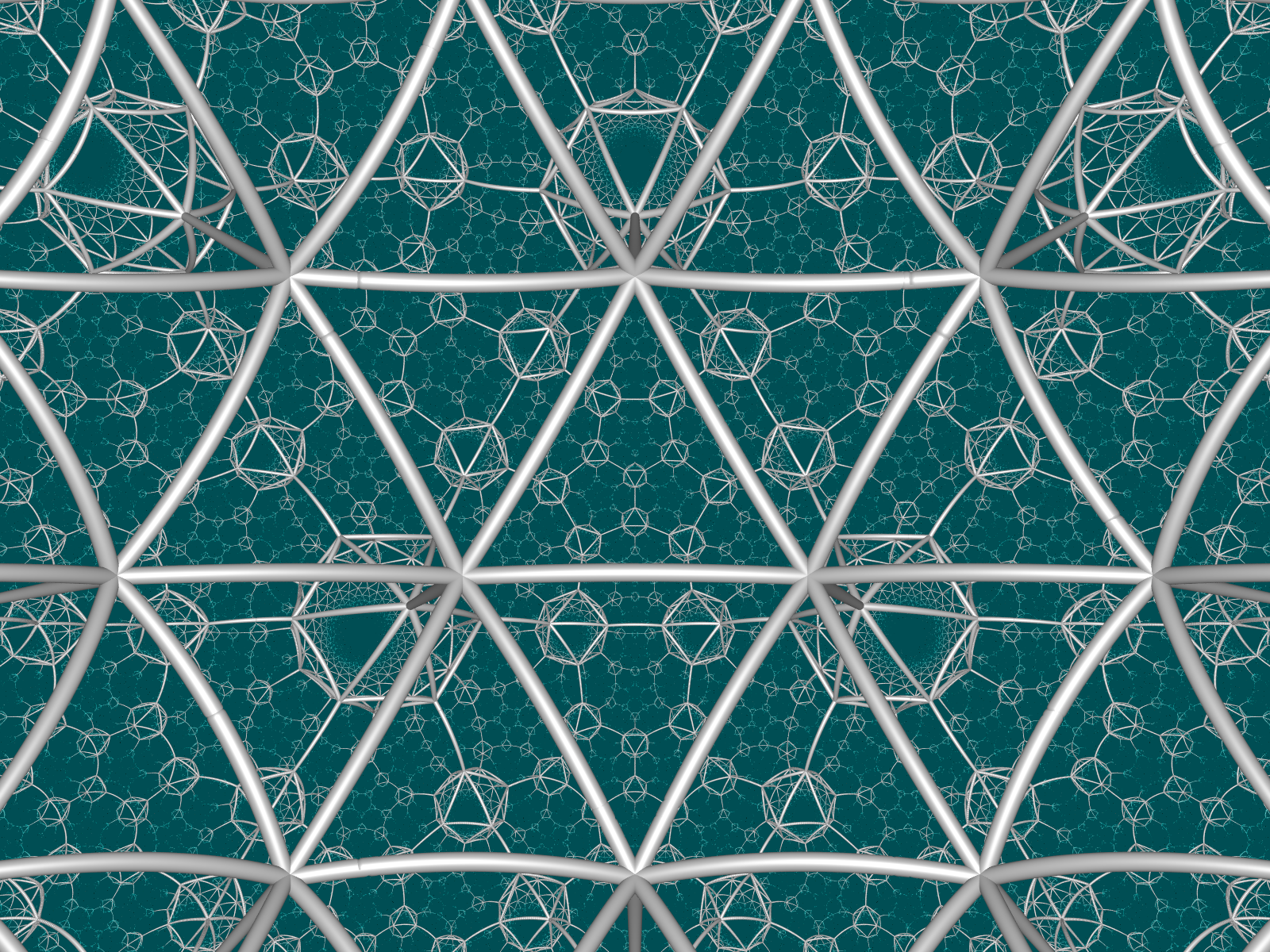

=== Bitruncated order-6 dodecahedral honeycomb ===
The bitruncated order-6 dodecahedral honeycomb is the same as the bitruncated order-5 hexagonal tiling honeycomb.

=== Cantellated order-6 dodecahedral honeycomb ===
Cantellated order-6 dodecahedral honeycomb
| Type | Paracompact uniform honeycomb |
| Schläfli symbols | rr{5,3,6} t_{0,2}{5,3,6} |
| Coxeter diagrams | ↔ |
| Cells | rr{5,3} rr{6,3} {}x{6} |
| Faces | triangle {3} square {4} pentagon {5} hexagon {6} |
| Vertex figure | wedge |
| Coxeter groups | $\overline{HV}_3$, [5,3,6] $\overline{HP}_3$, [5,3^{[3]}] |
| Properties | Vertex-transitive |

The cantellated order-6 dodecahedral honeycomb, t_{0,2}{5,3,6}, has rhombicosidodecahedron, trihexagonal tiling, and hexagonal prism cells, with a wedge vertex figure.

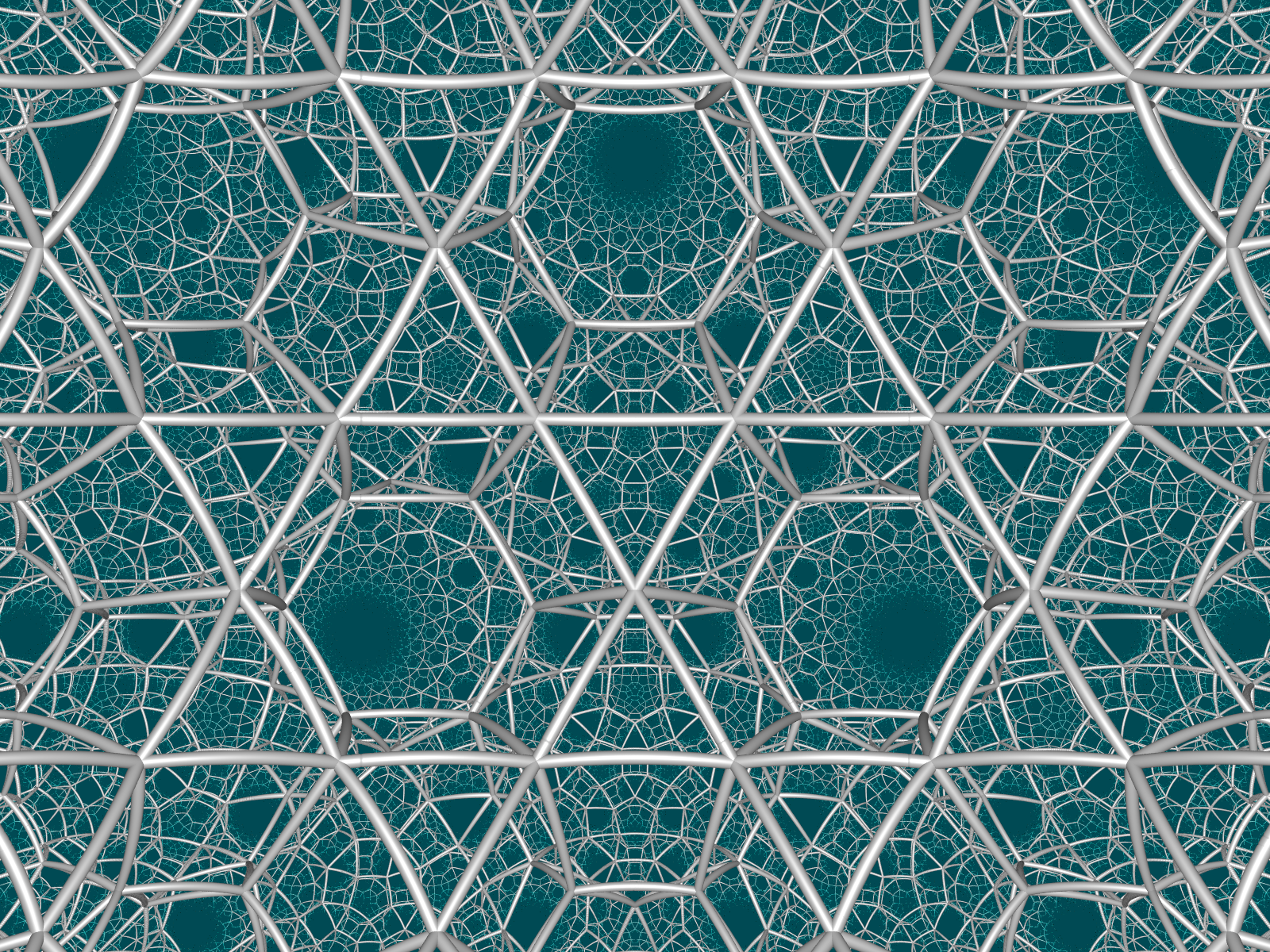

=== Cantitruncated order-6 dodecahedral honeycomb ===
Cantitruncated order-6 dodecahedral honeycomb
| Type | Paracompact uniform honeycomb |
| Schläfli symbols | tr{5,3,6} t_{0,1,2}{5,3,6} |
| Coxeter diagrams | ↔ |
| Cells | tr{5,3} t{3,6} {}x{6} |
| Faces | square {4} hexagon {6} decagon {10} |
| Vertex figure | mirrored sphenoid |
| Coxeter groups | $\overline{HV}_3$, [5,3,6] $\overline{HP}_3$, [5,3^{[3]}] |
| Properties | Vertex-transitive |

The cantitruncated order-6 dodecahedral honeycomb, t_{0,1,2}{5,3,6} has truncated icosidodecahedron, hexagonal tiling, and hexagonal prism facets, with a mirrored sphenoid vertex figure.

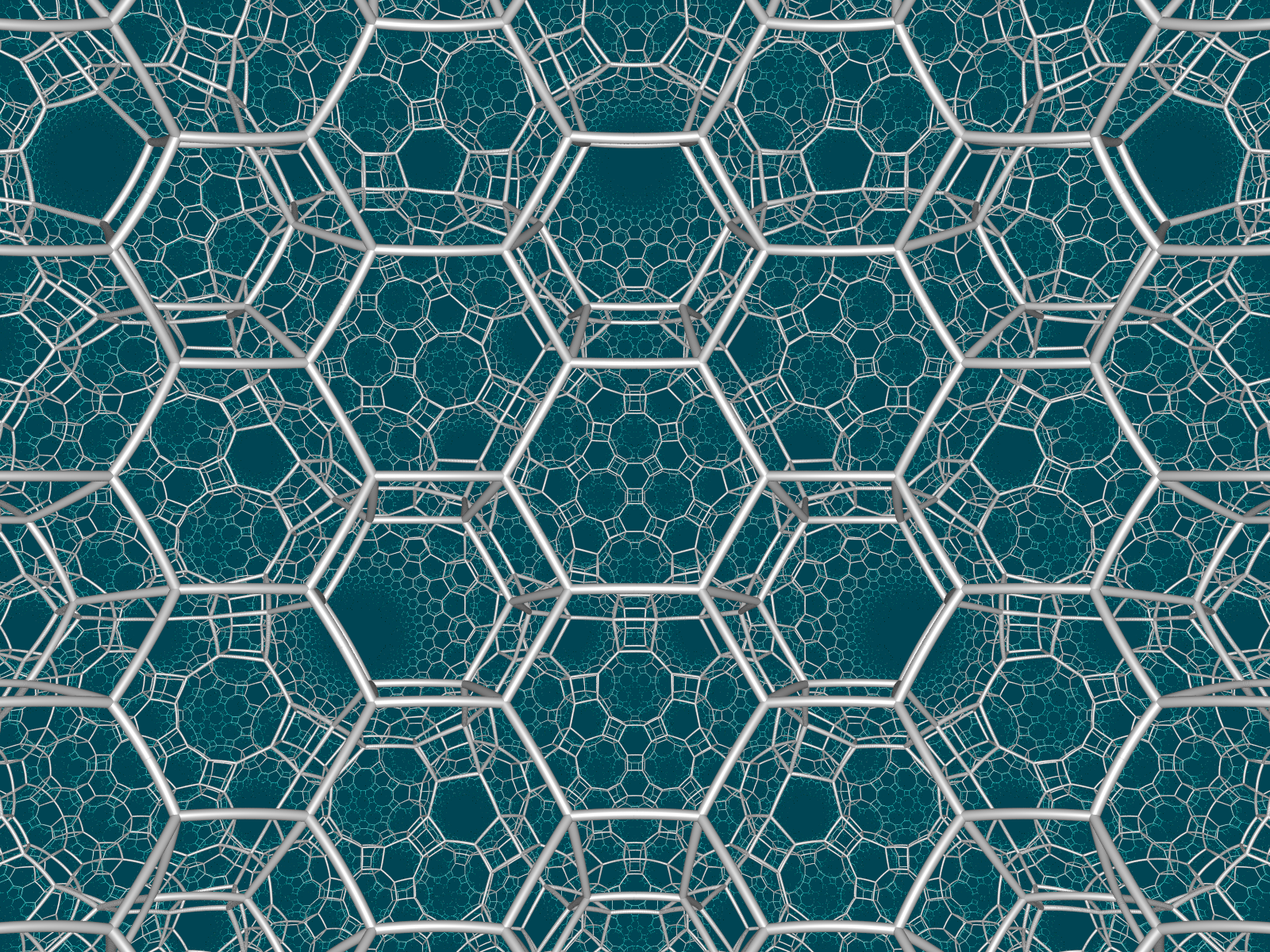

=== Runcinated order-6 dodecahedral honeycomb ===
The runcinated order-6 dodecahedral honeycomb is the same as the runcinated order-5 hexagonal tiling honeycomb.

=== Runcitruncated order-6 dodecahedral honeycomb ===
Runcitruncated order-6 dodecahedral honeycomb
| Type | Paracompact uniform honeycomb |
| Schläfli symbols | t_{0,1,3}{5,3,6} |
| Coxeter diagrams | |
| Cells | t{5,3} rr{6,3} {}x{10} {}x{6} |
| Faces | square {4} hexagon {6} decagon {10} |
| Vertex figure | isosceles-trapezoidal pyramid |
| Coxeter groups | $\overline{HV}_3$, [5,3,6] |
| Properties | Vertex-transitive |

The runcitruncated order-6 dodecahedral honeycomb, t_{0,1,3}{5,3,6} has truncated dodecahedron, rhombitrihexagonal tiling, decagonal prism, and hexagonal prism facets, with an isosceles-trapezoidal pyramid vertex figure.

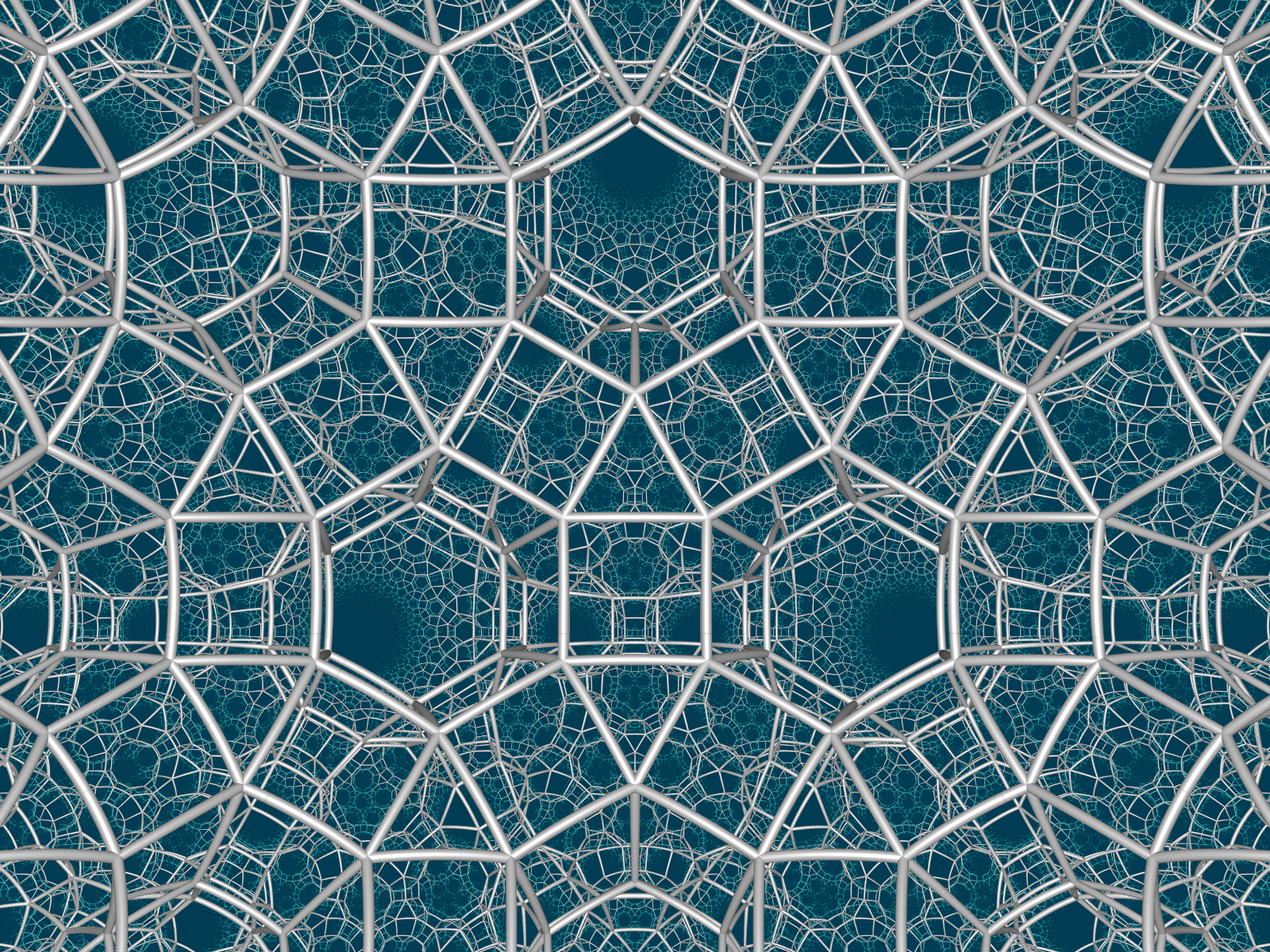

=== Runcicantellated order-6 dodecahedral honeycomb ===
The runcicantellated order-6 dodecahedral honeycomb is the same as the runcitruncated order-5 hexagonal tiling honeycomb.

=== Omnitruncated order-6 dodecahedral honeycomb ===
The omnitruncated order-6 dodecahedral honeycomb is the same as the omnitruncated order-5 hexagonal tiling honeycomb.

== See also ==
- Convex uniform honeycombs in hyperbolic space
- Regular tessellations of hyperbolic 3-space
- Paracompact uniform honeycombs
