= Order-6 tetrahedral honeycomb =

Order-6 tetrahedral honeycomb
Perspective projection view within Poincaré disk model
Type	Hyperbolic regular honeycomb Paracompact uniform honeycomb
Schläfli symbols	{3,3,6} {3,3^{[3]}}
Coxeter diagrams	↔
Cells	{3,3}
Faces	triangle {3}
Edge figure	hexagon {6}
Vertex figure	triangular tiling
Dual	Hexagonal tiling honeycomb
Coxeter groups	${\overline{V}}_3$, [3,3,6] ${\overline{P}}_3$, [3,3^{[3]}]
Properties	Regular, quasiregular

In hyperbolic 3-space, the order-6 tetrahedral honeycomb is a paracompact regular space-filling tessellation (or honeycomb). It is paracompact because it has vertex figures composed of an infinite number of faces, and has all vertices as ideal points at infinity. With Schläfli symbol {3,3,6}, the order-6 tetrahedral honeycomb has six ideal tetrahedra around each edge. All vertices are ideal, with infinitely many tetrahedra existing around each vertex in a triangular tiling vertex figure.

A geometric honeycomb is a space-filling of polyhedral or higher-dimensional cells, so that there are no gaps. It is an example of the more general mathematical tiling or tessellation in any number of dimensions.

Honeycombs are usually constructed in ordinary Euclidean ("flat") space, like the convex uniform honeycombs. They may also be constructed in non-Euclidean spaces, such as hyperbolic uniform honeycombs. Any finite uniform polytope can be projected to its circumsphere to form a uniform honeycomb in spherical space.

== Symmetry constructions ==
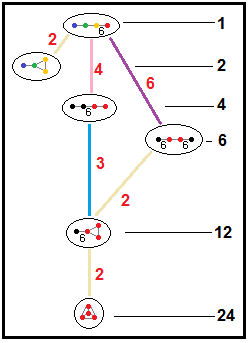
Subgroup relations

The order-6 tetrahedral honeycomb has a second construction as a uniform honeycomb, with Schläfli symbol {3,3^{[3]}}. This construction contains alternating types, or colors, of tetrahedral cells. In Coxeter notation, this half symmetry is represented as [3,3,6,1^{+}] ↔ [3,((3,3,3))], or [3,3^{[3]}]: ↔.

== Related polytopes and honeycombs ==
The order-6 tetrahedral honeycomb is analogous to the two-dimensional infinite-order triangular tiling, {3,∞}. Both tessellations are regular, and only contain triangles and ideal vertices.

The order-6 tetrahedral honeycomb is also a regular hyperbolic honeycomb in 3-space, and one of 11 which are paracompact.

11 paracompact regular honeycombs
{6,3,3}	{6,3,4}	{6,3,5}	{6,3,6}	{4,4,3}	{4,4,4}
{3,3,6}	{4,3,6}	{5,3,6}	{3,6,3}	{3,4,4}	

This honeycomb is one of 15 uniform paracompact honeycombs in the [6,3,3] Coxeter group, along with its dual, the hexagonal tiling honeycomb.

[6,3,3] family honeycombs
{6,3,3}	r{6,3,3}	t{6,3,3}	rr{6,3,3}	t_{0,3}{6,3,3}	tr{6,3,3}	t_{0,1,3}{6,3,3}	t_{0,1,2,3}{6,3,3}
{3,3,6}	r{3,3,6}	t{3,3,6}	rr{3,3,6}	2t{3,3,6}	tr{3,3,6}	t_{0,1,3}{3,3,6}	t_{0,1,2,3}{3,3,6}

The order-6 tetrahedral honeycomb is part of a sequence of regular polychora and honeycombs with tetrahedral cells.

{3,3,p} polytopes
Space	S^{3}			H^{3}			
Form	Finite			Paracompact	Noncompact		
Name	{3,3,3}	{3,3,4}	{3,3,5}	{3,3,6}	{3,3,7}	{3,3,8}	... {3,3,∞}
Image							
Vertex figure	{3,3}	{3,4}	{3,5}	{3,6}	{3,7}	{3,8}	{3,∞}

It is also part of a sequence of honeycombs with triangular tiling vertex figures.

Hyperbolic uniform honeycombs: {p,3,6} and {p,3^{[3]}}
Form	Paracompact				Noncompact		
Name	{3,3,6} {3,3^{[3]}}	{4,3,6} {4,3^{[3]}}	{5,3,6} {5,3^{[3]}}	{6,3,6} {6,3^{[3]}}	{7,3,6} {7,3^{[3]}}	{8,3,6} {8,3^{[3]}}	... {∞,3,6} {∞,3^{[3]}}
Image							
Cells	{3,3}	{4,3}	{5,3}	{6,3}	{7,3}	{8,3}	{∞,3}

=== Rectified order-6 tetrahedral honeycomb ===
Rectified order-6 tetrahedral honeycomb
Type	Paracompact uniform honeycomb Semiregular honeycomb
Schläfli symbols	r{3,3,6} or t_{1}{3,3,6}
Coxeter diagrams	↔
Cells	r{3,3} {3,6}
Faces	triangle {3}
Vertex figure	hexagonal prism
Coxeter groups	${\overline{V}}_3$, [3,3,6] ${\overline{P}}_3$, [3,3^{[3]}]
Properties	Vertex-transitive, edge-transitive

The rectified order-6 tetrahedral honeycomb, t_{1}{3,3,6} has octahedral and triangular tiling cells arranged in a hexagonal prism vertex figure.

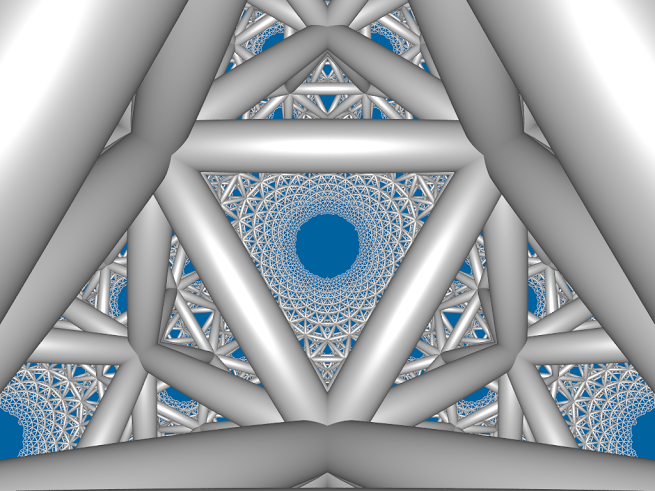
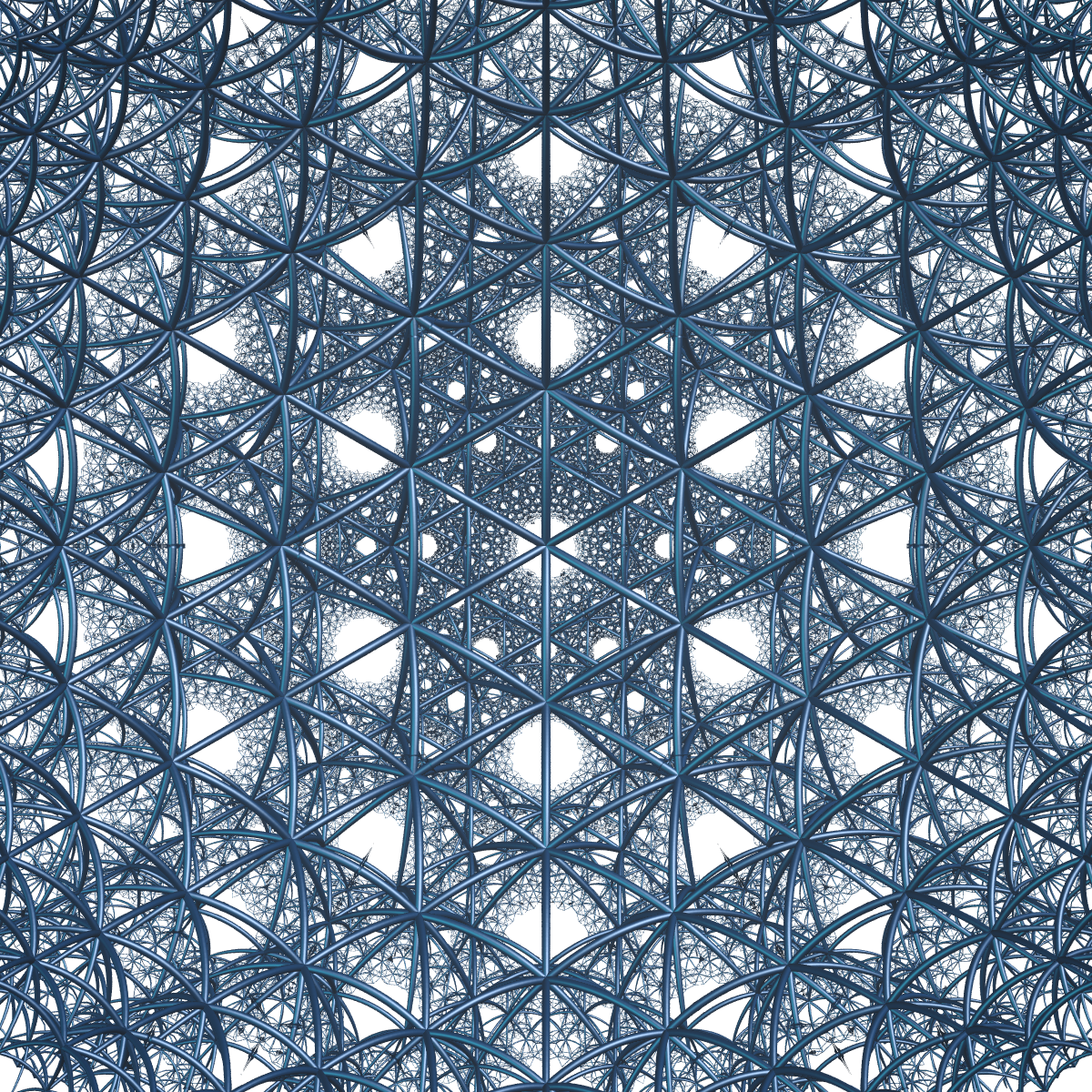
Perspective projection view within Poincaré disk model

r{p,3,6}
Space	H^{3}					
Form	Paracompact				Noncompact	
Name	r{3,3,6}	r{4,3,6}	r{5,3,6}	r{6,3,6}	r{7,3,6}	... r{∞,3,6}
Image						
Cells {3,6}	r{3,3}	r{4,3}	r{5,3}	r{6,3}	r{7,3}	r{∞,3}

=== Truncated order-6 tetrahedral honeycomb ===
Truncated order-6 tetrahedral honeycomb
Type	Paracompact uniform honeycomb
Schläfli symbols	t{3,3,6} or t_{0,1}{3,3,6}
Coxeter diagrams	↔
Cells	t{3,3} {3,6}
Faces	triangle {3} hexagon {6}
Vertex figure	hexagonal pyramid
Coxeter groups	${\overline{V}}_3$, [3,3,6] ${\overline{P}}_3$, [3,3^{[3]}]
Properties	Vertex-transitive

The truncated order-6 tetrahedral honeycomb, t_{0,1}{3,3,6} has truncated tetrahedron and triangular tiling cells arranged in a hexagonal pyramid vertex figure.

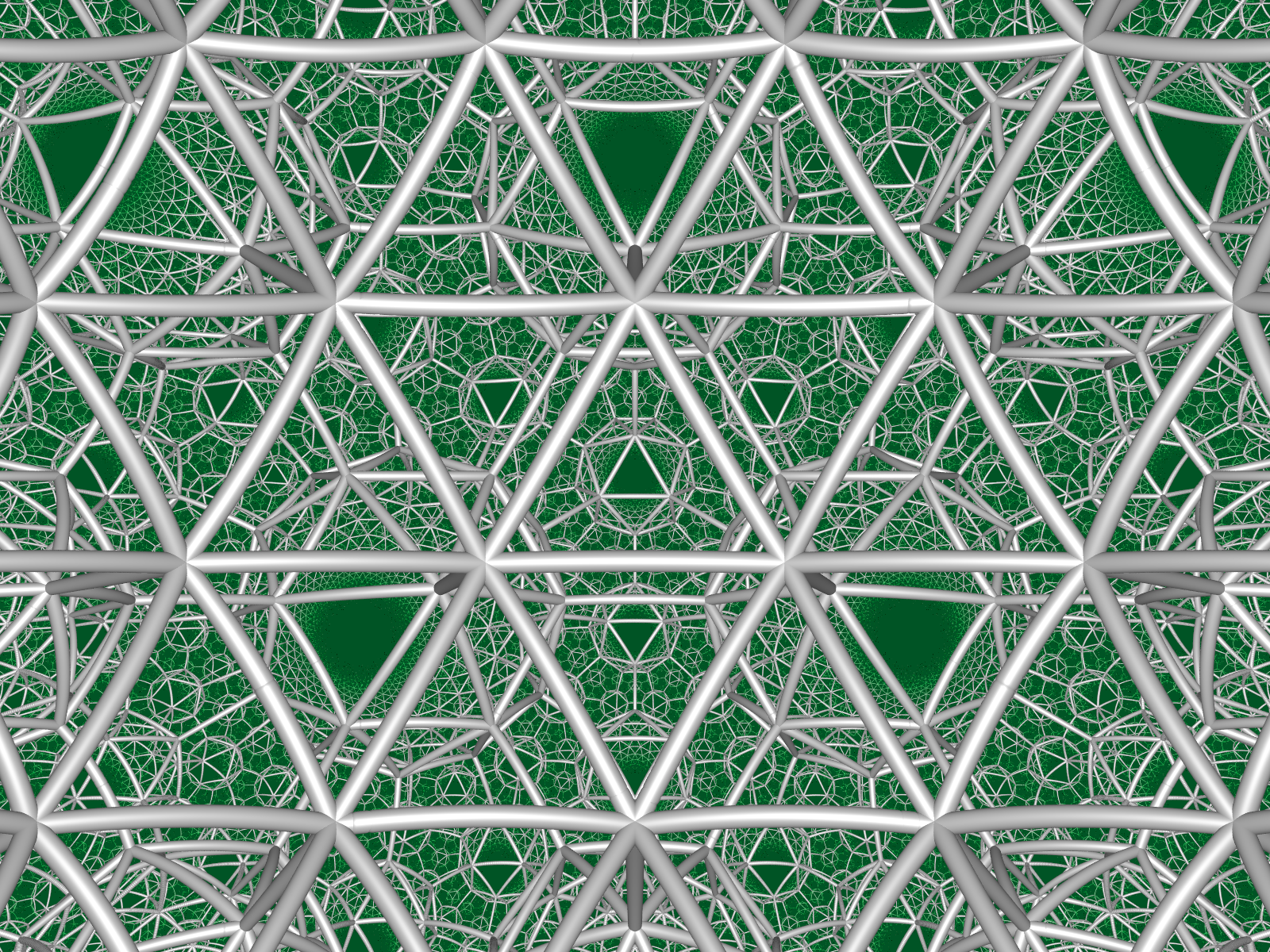

=== Bitruncated order-6 tetrahedral honeycomb ===
The bitruncated order-6 tetrahedral honeycomb is equivalent to the bitruncated hexagonal tiling honeycomb.

=== Cantellated order-6 tetrahedral honeycomb ===
Cantellated order-6 tetrahedral honeycomb
Type	Paracompact uniform honeycomb
Schläfli symbols	rr{3,3,6} or t_{0,2}{3,3,6}
Coxeter diagrams	↔
Cells	r{3,3} r{3,6} {}x{6}
Faces	triangle {3} square {4} hexagon {6}
Vertex figure	isosceles triangular prism
Coxeter groups	${\overline{V}}_3$, [3,3,6] ${\overline{P}}_3$, [3,3^{[3]}]
Properties	Vertex-transitive

The cantellated order-6 tetrahedral honeycomb, t_{0,2}{3,3,6} has cuboctahedron, trihexagonal tiling, and hexagonal prism cells arranged in an isosceles triangular prism vertex figure.

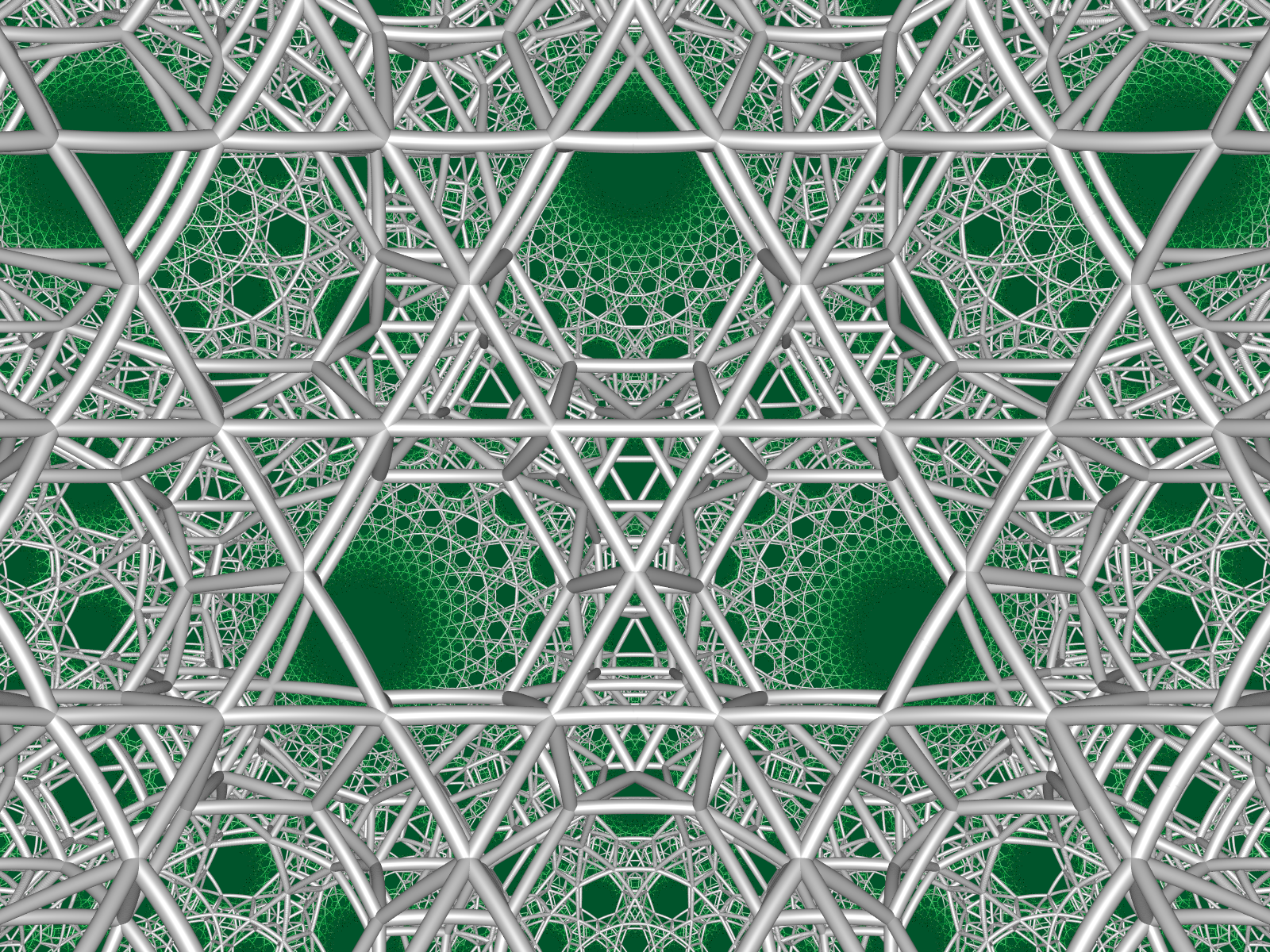

=== Cantitruncated order-6 tetrahedral honeycomb ===
Cantitruncated order-6 tetrahedral honeycomb
Type	Paracompact uniform honeycomb
Schläfli symbols	tr{3,3,6} or t_{0,1,2}{3,3,6}
Coxeter diagrams	↔
Cells	tr{3,3} t{3,6} {}x{6}
Faces	square {4} hexagon {6}
Vertex figure	mirrored sphenoid
Coxeter groups	${\overline{V}}_3$, [3,3,6] ${\overline{P}}_3$, [3,3^{[3]}]
Properties	Vertex-transitive

The cantitruncated order-6 tetrahedral honeycomb, t_{0,1,2}{3,3,6} has truncated octahedron, hexagonal tiling, and hexagonal prism cells connected in a mirrored sphenoid vertex figure.

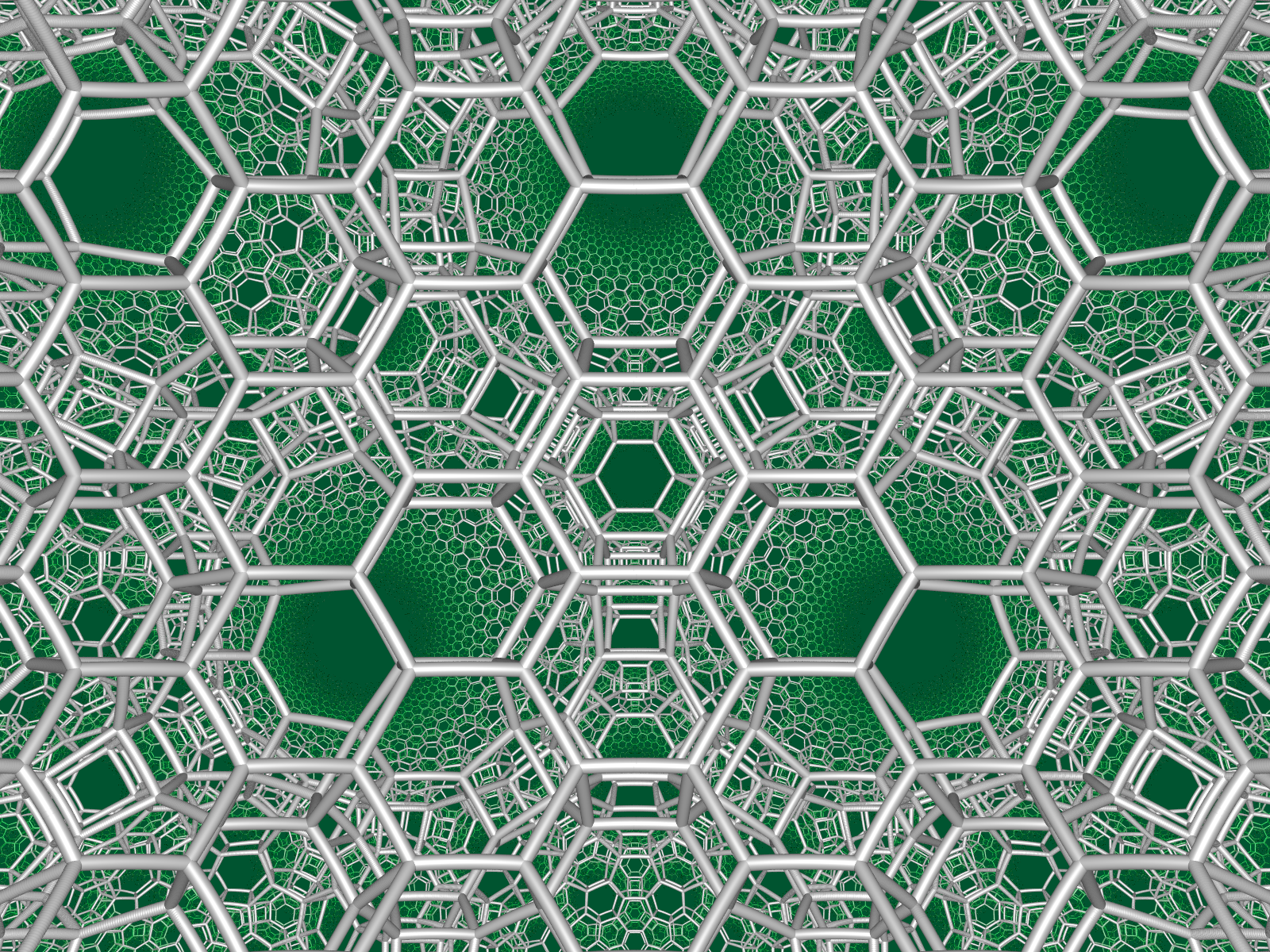

=== Runcinated order-6 tetrahedral honeycomb ===
The bitruncated order-6 tetrahedral honeycomb is equivalent to the bitruncated hexagonal tiling honeycomb.

=== Runcitruncated order-6 tetrahedral honeycomb ===
The runcitruncated order-6 tetrahedral honeycomb is equivalent to the runcicantellated hexagonal tiling honeycomb.

=== Runcicantellated order-6 tetrahedral honeycomb ===
The runcicantellated order-6 tetrahedral honeycomb is equivalent to the runcitruncated hexagonal tiling honeycomb.

=== Omnitruncated order-6 tetrahedral honeycomb ===
The omnitruncated order-6 tetrahedral honeycomb is equivalent to the omnitruncated hexagonal tiling honeycomb.

== See also ==
- Convex uniform honeycombs in hyperbolic space
- Regular tessellations of hyperbolic 3-space
- Paracompact uniform honeycombs
