= Order-6 hexagonal tiling honeycomb =

Order-6 hexagonal tiling honeycomb
Perspective projection view from center of Poincaré disk model
Type	Hyperbolic regular honeycomb Paracompact uniform honeycomb
Schläfli symbol	{6,3,6} {6,3^{[3]}}
Coxeter diagram	↔ ↔
Cells	{6,3}
Faces	hexagon {6}
Edge figure	hexagon {6}
Vertex figure	{3,6} or {3^{[3]}}
Dual	Self-dual
Coxeter group	$\overline{Z}_3$, [6,3,6] $\overline{VP}_3$, [6,3^{[3]}]
Properties	Regular, quasiregular

In the field of hyperbolic geometry, the order-6 hexagonal tiling honeycomb is one of 11 regular paracompact honeycombs in 3-dimensional hyperbolic space. It is paracompact because it has cells with an infinite number of faces. Each cell is a hexagonal tiling whose vertices lie on a horosphere: a flat plane in hyperbolic space that approaches a single ideal point at infinity.

The Schläfli symbol of the hexagonal tiling honeycomb is {6,3,6}. Since that of the hexagonal tiling of the plane is {6,3}, this honeycomb has six such hexagonal tilings meeting at each edge. Since the Schläfli symbol of the triangular tiling is {3,6}, the vertex figure of this honeycomb is a triangular tiling. Thus, infinitely many hexagonal tilings meet at each vertex of this honeycomb.

A geometric honeycomb is a space-filling of polyhedral or higher-dimensional cells, so that there are no gaps. It is an example of the more general mathematical tiling or tessellation in any number of dimensions.

Honeycombs are usually constructed in ordinary Euclidean ("flat") space, like the convex uniform honeycombs. They may also be constructed in non-Euclidean spaces, such as hyperbolic uniform honeycombs. Any finite uniform polytope can be projected to its circumsphere to form a uniform honeycomb in spherical space.

== Related tilings ==
The order-6 hexagonal tiling honeycomb is analogous to the 2D hyperbolic infinite-order apeirogonal tiling, {∞,∞}, with infinite apeirogonal faces, and with all vertices on the ideal surface.

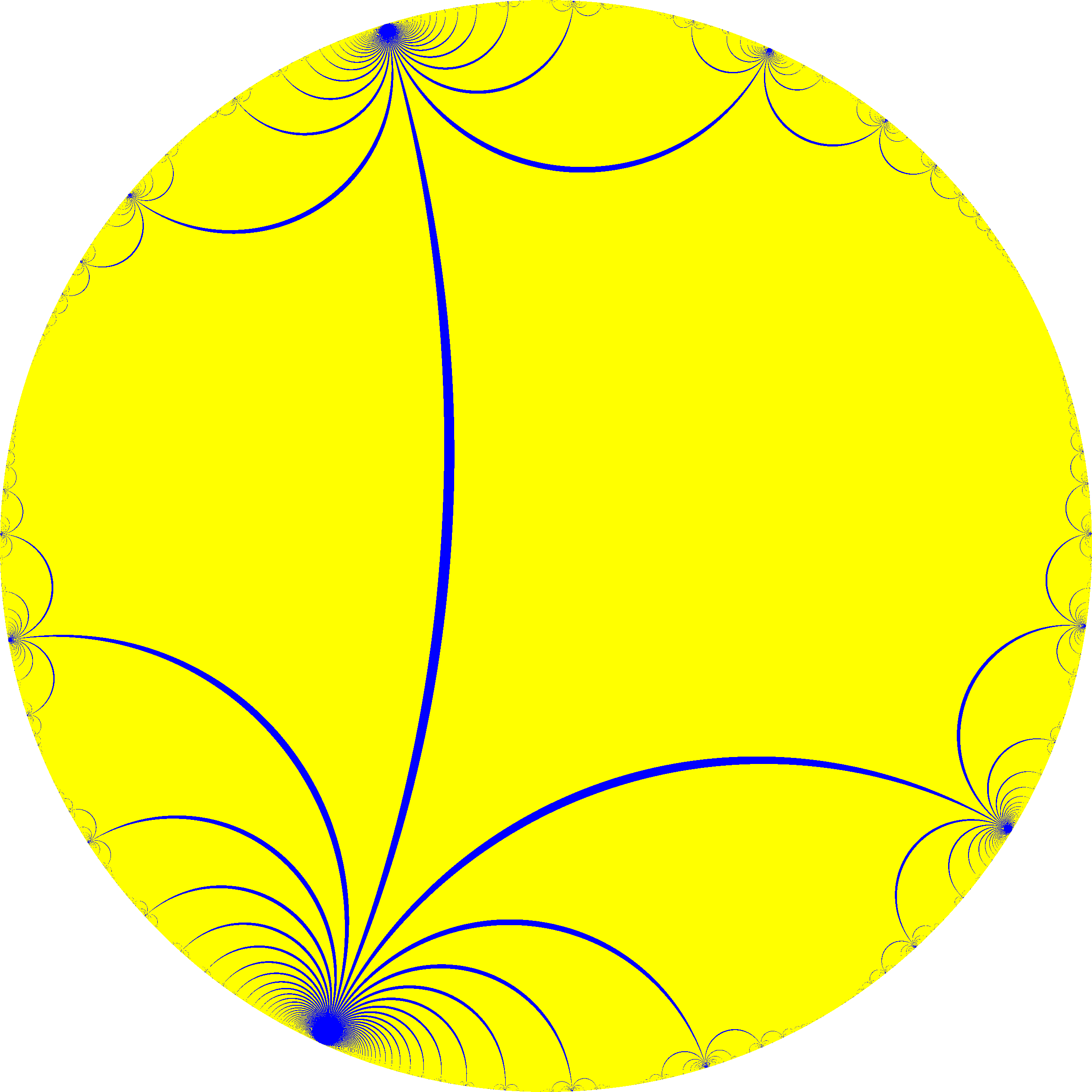

It contains and that tile 2-hypercycle surfaces, which are similar to the paracompact tilings and (the truncated infinite-order triangular tiling and order-3 apeirogonal tiling, respectively):

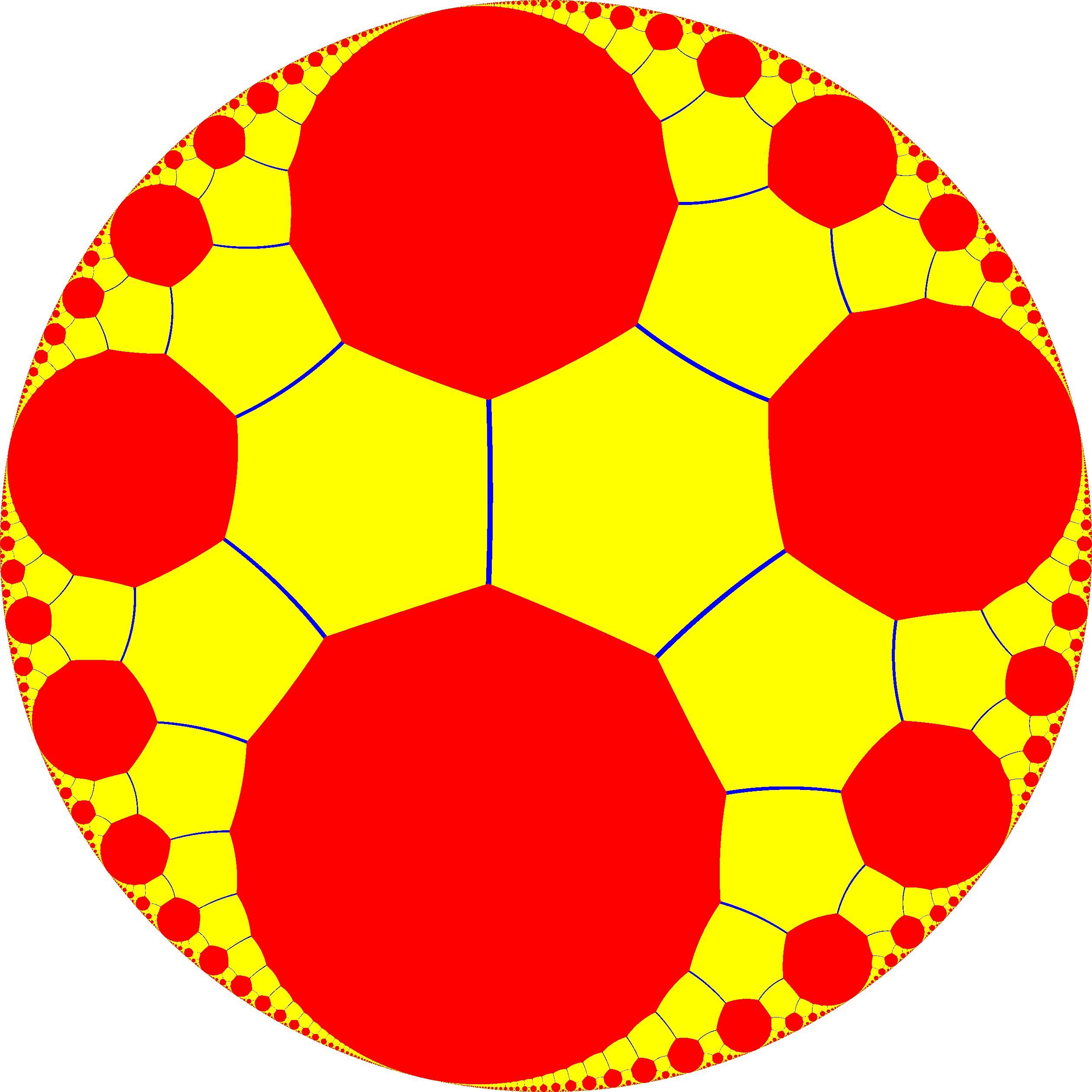

== Symmetry ==
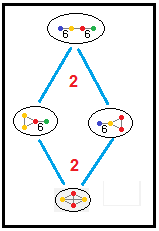
Subgroup relations: ↔

The order-6 hexagonal tiling honeycomb has a half-symmetry construction:.

It also has an index-6 subgroup, [6,3^{*},6], with a non-simplex fundamental domain. This subgroup corresponds to a Coxeter diagram with six order-3 branches and three infinite-order branches in the shape of a triangular prism:.

== Related polytopes and honeycombs ==
The order-6 hexagonal tiling honeycomb is a regular hyperbolic honeycomb in 3-space, and one of eleven paracompact honeycombs in 3-space.

11 paracompact regular honeycombs
{6,3,3}	{6,3,4}	{6,3,5}	{6,3,6}	{4,4,3}	{4,4,4}
{3,3,6}	{4,3,6}	{5,3,6}	{3,6,3}	{3,4,4}	

There are nine uniform honeycombs in the [6,3,6] Coxeter group family, including this regular form.

[6,3,6] family honeycombs
{6,3,6}	r{6,3,6}	t{6,3,6}	rr{6,3,6}	t_{0,3}{6,3,6}	2t{6,3,6}	tr{6,3,6}	t_{0,1,3}{6,3,6}	t_{0,1,2,3}{6,3,6}

This honeycomb has a related alternated honeycomb, the triangular tiling honeycomb, but with a lower symmetry: ↔.

The order-6 hexagonal tiling honeycomb is part of a sequence of regular polychora and honeycombs with triangular tiling vertex figures:

Hyperbolic uniform honeycombs: {p,3,6}
Form	Paracompact				Noncompact		
Name	{3,3,6}	{4,3,6}	{5,3,6}	{6,3,6}	{7,3,6}	{8,3,6}	... {∞,3,6}
Image							
Cells	{3,3}	{4,3}	{5,3}	{6,3}	{7,3}	{8,3}	{∞,3}

It is also part of a sequence of regular polychora and honeycombs with hexagonal tiling cells:

{6,3,p} honeycombs
Space	H^{3}						
Form	Paracompact				Noncompact		
Name	{6,3,3}	{6,3,4}	{6,3,5}	{6,3,6}	{6,3,7}	{6,3,8}	... {6,3,∞}
Coxeter							
Image							
Vertex figure {3,p}	{3,3}	{3,4}	{3,5}	{3,6}	{3,7}	{3,8}	{3,∞}

It is also part of a sequence of regular polychora and honeycombs with regular deltahedral vertex figures:

{p,3,p} regular honeycombs
Space	S^{3}	Euclidean E^{3}	H^{3}				
Form	Finite	Affine	Compact	Paracompact	Noncompact		
Name	{3,3,3}	{4,3,4}	{5,3,5}	{6,3,6}	{7,3,7}	{8,3,8}	...{∞,3,∞}
Image							
Cells	{3,3}	{4,3}	{5,3}	{6,3}	{7,3}	{8,3}	{∞,3}
Vertex figure	{3,3}	{3,4}	{3,5}	{3,6}	{3,7}	{3,8}	{3,∞}

=== Rectified order-6 hexagonal tiling honeycomb ===
Rectified order-6 hexagonal tiling honeycomb
Type	Paracompact uniform honeycomb
Schläfli symbols	r{6,3,6} or t_{1}{6,3,6}
Coxeter diagrams	↔ ↔ ↔ ↔
Cells	{3,6} r{6,3}
Faces	triangle {3} hexagon {6}
Vertex figure	hexagonal prism
Coxeter groups	$\overline{Z}_3$, [6,3,6] $\overline{VP}_3$, [6,3^{[3]}] $\overline{PP}_3$, [3^{[3,3]}]
Properties	Vertex-transitive, edge-transitive

The rectified order-6 hexagonal tiling honeycomb, t_{1}{6,3,6}, has triangular tiling and trihexagonal tiling facets, with a hexagonal prism vertex figure.

it can also be seen as a quarter order-6 hexagonal tiling honeycomb, q{6,3,6}, ↔.

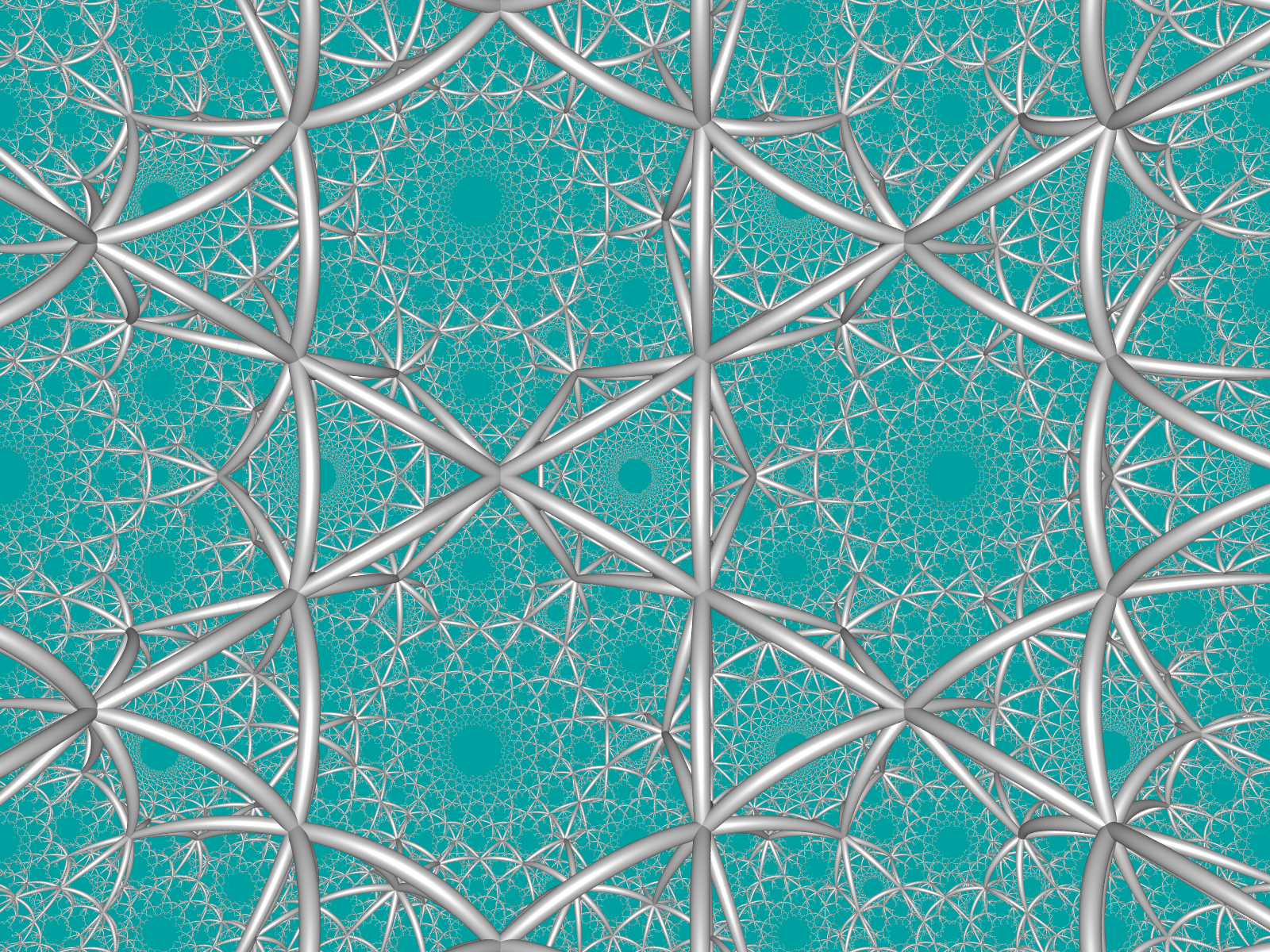

It is analogous to 2D hyperbolic order-4 apeirogonal tiling, r{∞,∞} with infinite apeirogonal faces, and with all vertices on the ideal surface.

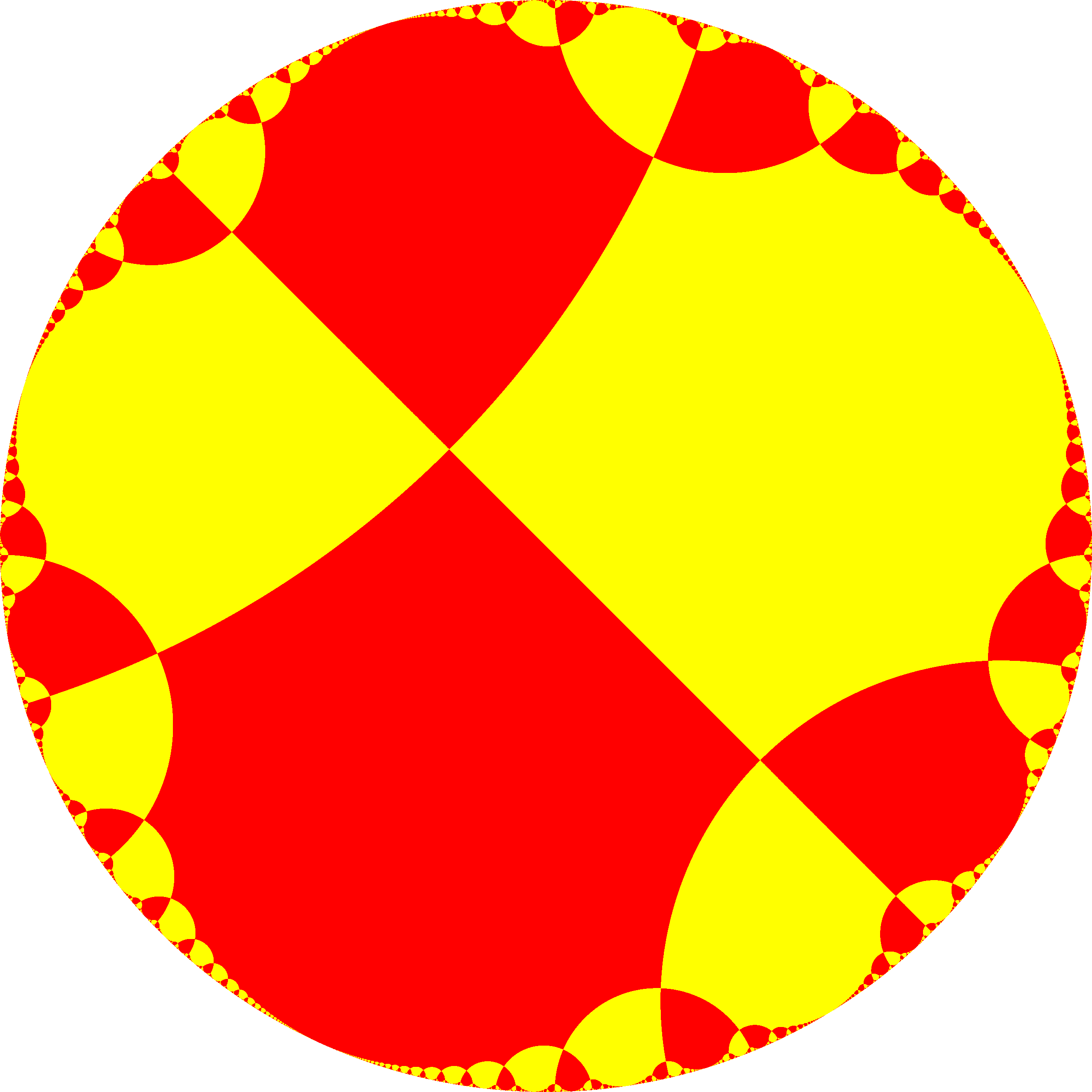

==== Related honeycombs ====
The order-6 hexagonal tiling honeycomb is part of a series of honeycombs with hexagonal prism vertex figures:

r{p,3,6}
Space	H^{3}					
Form	Paracompact				Noncompact	
Name	r{3,3,6}	r{4,3,6}	r{5,3,6}	r{6,3,6}	r{7,3,6}	... r{∞,3,6}
Image						
Cells {3,6}	r{3,3}	r{4,3}	r{5,3}	r{6,3}	r{7,3}	r{∞,3}

It is also part of a matrix of 3-dimensional quarter honeycombs: q{2p,4,2q}

Euclidean/hyperbolic(paracompact/noncompact) quarter honeycombs q{p,3,q}
p \ q	4	6	8	... ∞
4	q{4,3,4} ↔ ↔	q{4,3,6} ↔ ↔	q{4,3,8} ↔	q{4,3,∞} ↔
6	q{6,3,4} ↔ ↔	q{6,3,6} ↔	q{6,3,8} ↔	q{6,3,∞} ↔
8	q{8,3,4} ↔	q{8,3,6} ↔	q{8,3,8} ↔	q{8,3,∞} ↔
... ∞	q{∞,3,4} ↔	q{∞,3,6} ↔	q{∞,3,8} ↔	q{∞,3,∞} ↔

=== Truncated order-6 hexagonal tiling honeycomb ===
Truncated order-6 hexagonal tiling honeycomb
Type	Paracompact uniform honeycomb
Schläfli symbol	t{6,3,6} or t_{0,1}{6,3,6}
Coxeter diagram	↔
Cells	{3,6} t{6,3}
Faces	triangle {3} dodecagon {12}
Vertex figure	hexagonal pyramid
Coxeter groups	$\overline{Z}_3$, [6,3,6] $\overline{VP}_3$, [6,3^{[3]}]
Properties	Vertex-transitive

The truncated order-6 hexagonal tiling honeycomb, t_{0,1}{6,3,6}, has triangular tiling and truncated hexagonal tiling facets, with a hexagonal pyramid vertex figure.

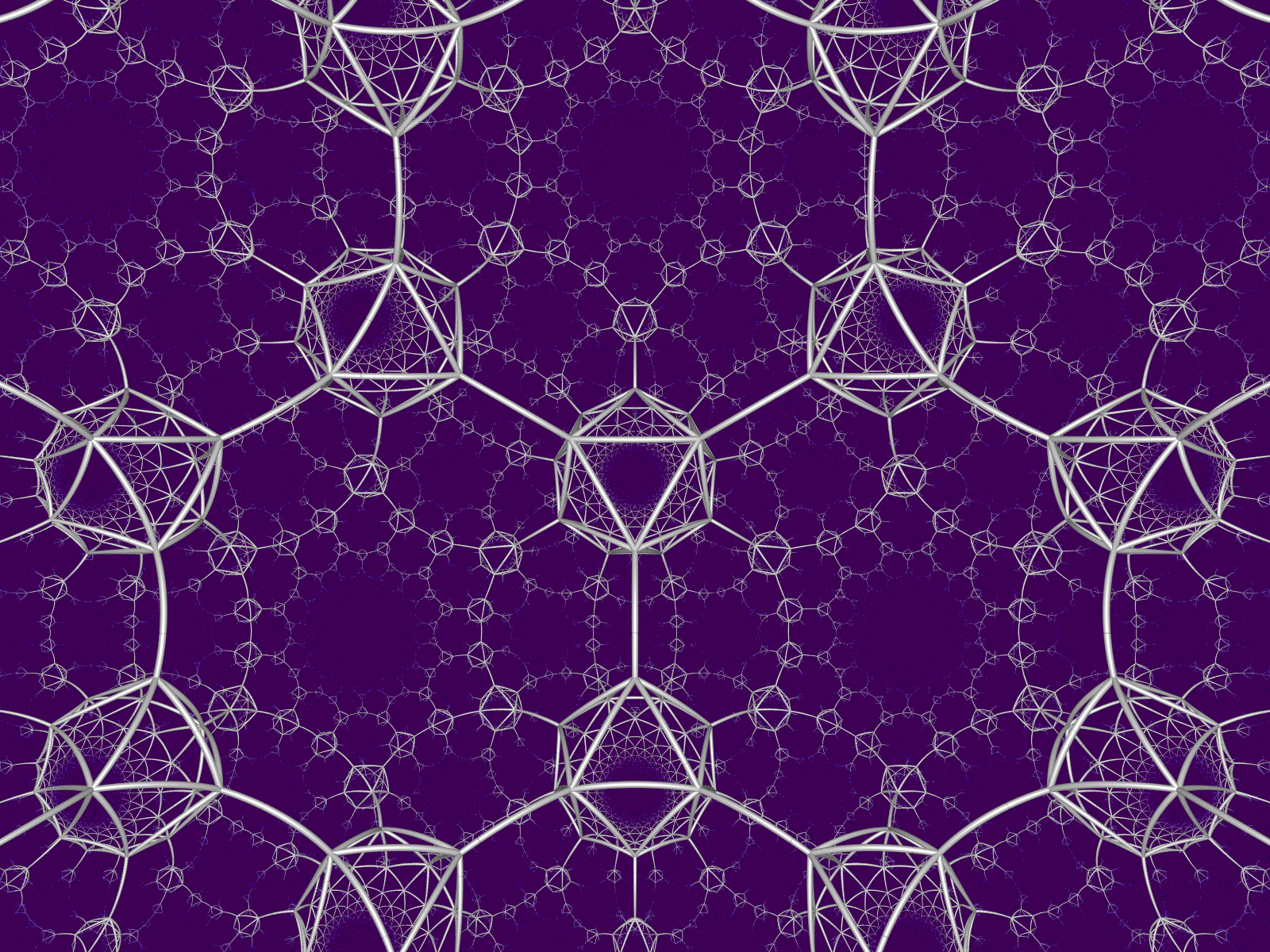

=== Bitruncated order-6 hexagonal tiling honeycomb ===
Bitruncated order-6 hexagonal tiling honeycomb
Type	Paracompact uniform honeycomb
Schläfli symbol	bt{6,3,6} or t_{1,2}{6,3,6}
Coxeter diagram	↔
Cells	t{3,6}
Faces	hexagon {6}
Vertex figure	tetrahedron
Coxeter groups	$2\times\overline{Z}_3$, [[6,3,6]] $\overline{VP}_3$, [6,3^{[3]}] $\overline{V}_3$, [3,3,6]
Properties	Regular

The bitruncated order-6 hexagonal tiling honeycomb is a lower symmetry construction of the regular hexagonal tiling honeycomb, ↔. It contains hexagonal tiling facets, with a tetrahedron vertex figure.

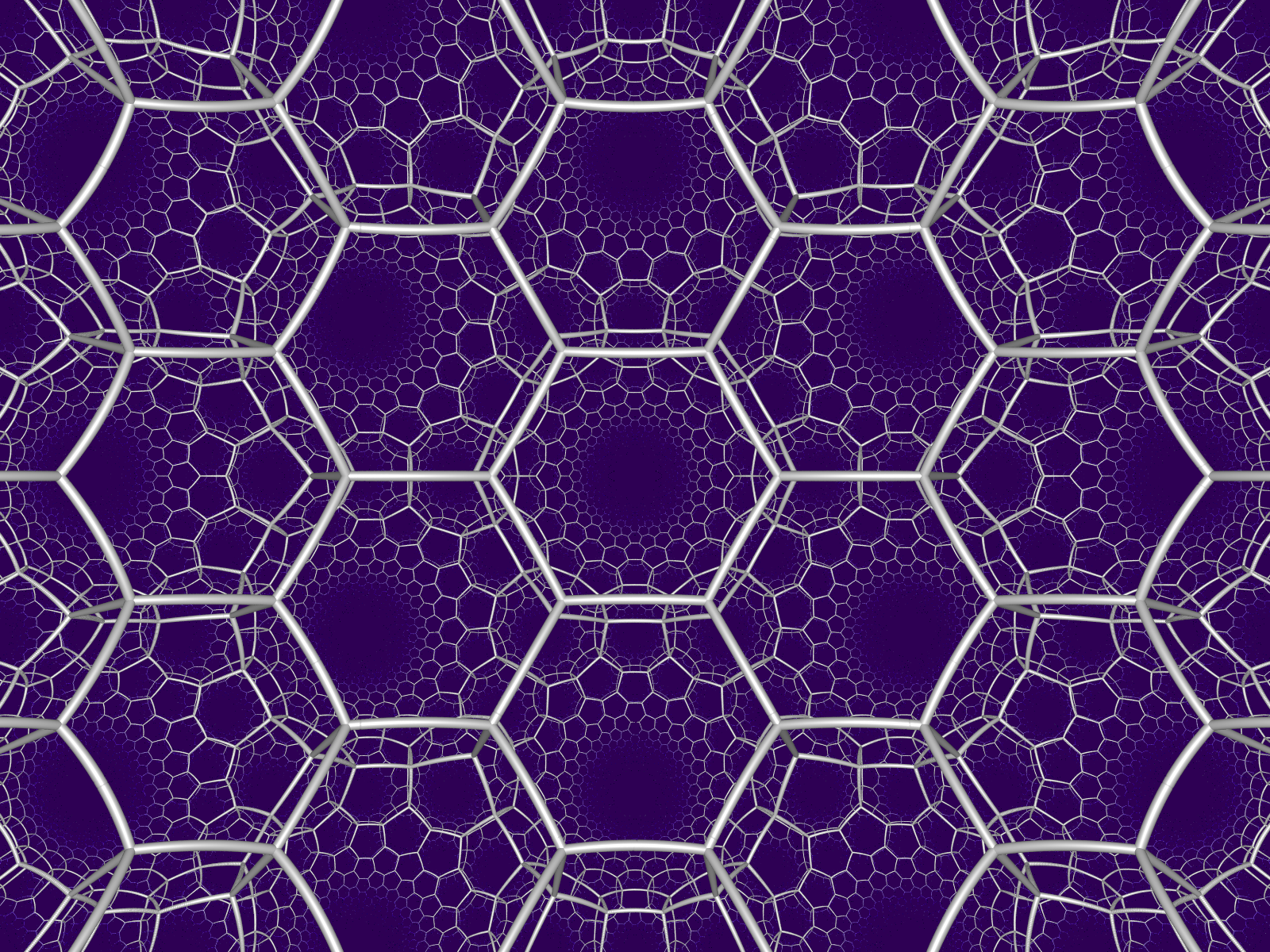

=== Cantellated order-6 hexagonal tiling honeycomb ===
Cantellated order-6 hexagonal tiling honeycomb
Type	Paracompact uniform honeycomb
Schläfli symbol	rr{6,3,6} or t_{0,2}{6,3,6}
Coxeter diagram	↔
Cells	r{3,6} rr{6,3} {}x{6}
Faces	triangle {3} square {4} hexagon {6}
Vertex figure	wedge
Coxeter groups	$\overline{Z}_3$, [6,3,6] $\overline{VP}_3$, [6,3^{[3]}]
Properties	Vertex-transitive

The cantellated order-6 hexagonal tiling honeycomb, t_{0,2}{6,3,6}, has trihexagonal tiling, rhombitrihexagonal tiling, and hexagonal prism cells, with a wedge vertex figure.

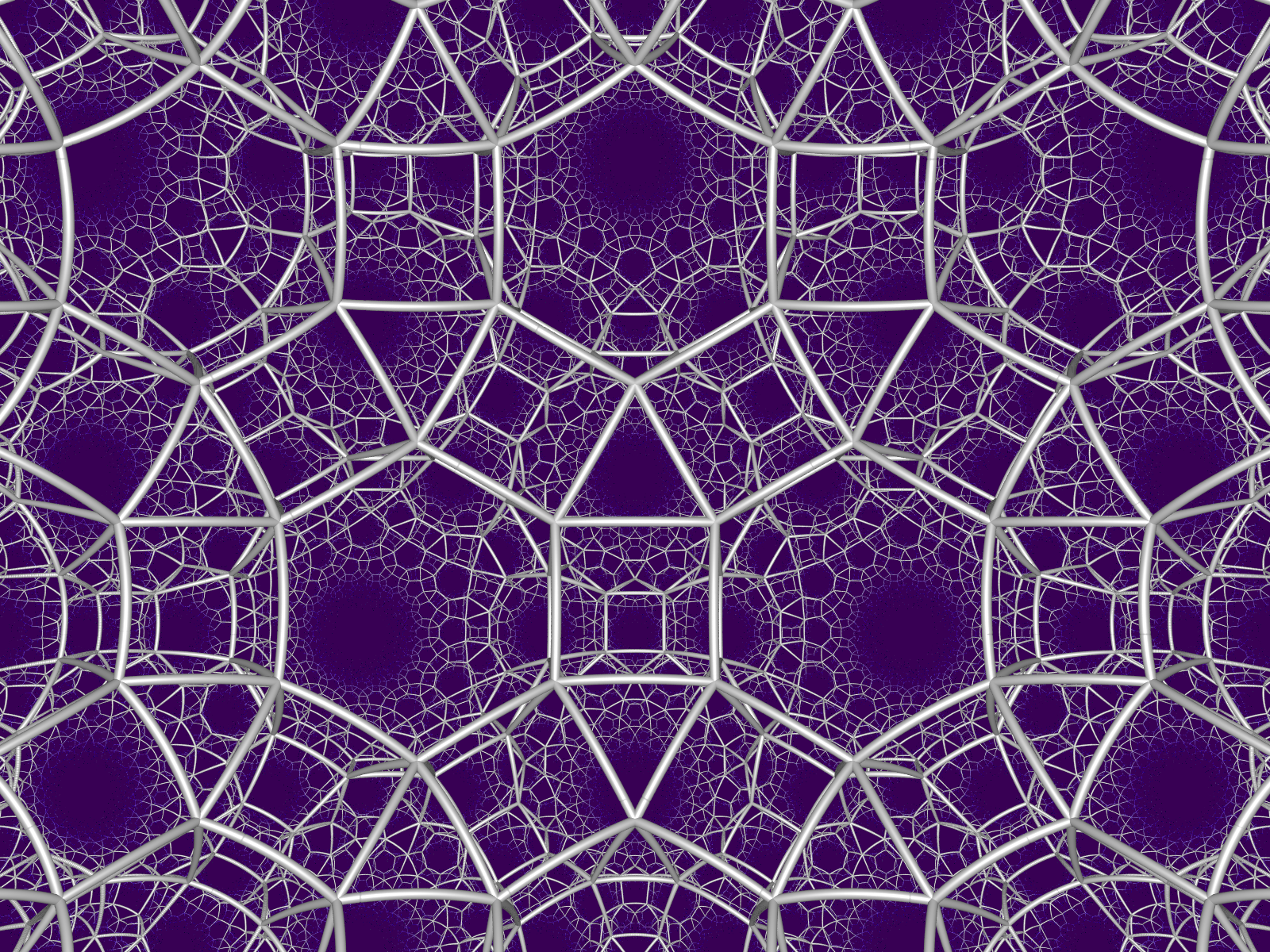

=== Cantitruncated order-6 hexagonal tiling honeycomb ===
Cantitruncated order-6 hexagonal tiling honeycomb
Type	Paracompact uniform honeycomb
Schläfli symbol	tr{6,3,6} or t_{0,1,2}{6,3,6}
Coxeter diagram	↔
Cells	tr{3,6} t{3,6} {}x{6}
Faces	triangle {3} square {4} hexagon {6} dodecagon {12}
Vertex figure	mirrored sphenoid
Coxeter groups	$\overline{Z}_3$, [6,3,6] $\overline{VP}_3$, [6,3^{[3]}]
Properties	Vertex-transitive

The cantitruncated order-6 hexagonal tiling honeycomb, t_{0,1,2}{6,3,6}, has hexagonal tiling, truncated trihexagonal tiling, and hexagonal prism cells, with a mirrored sphenoid vertex figure.

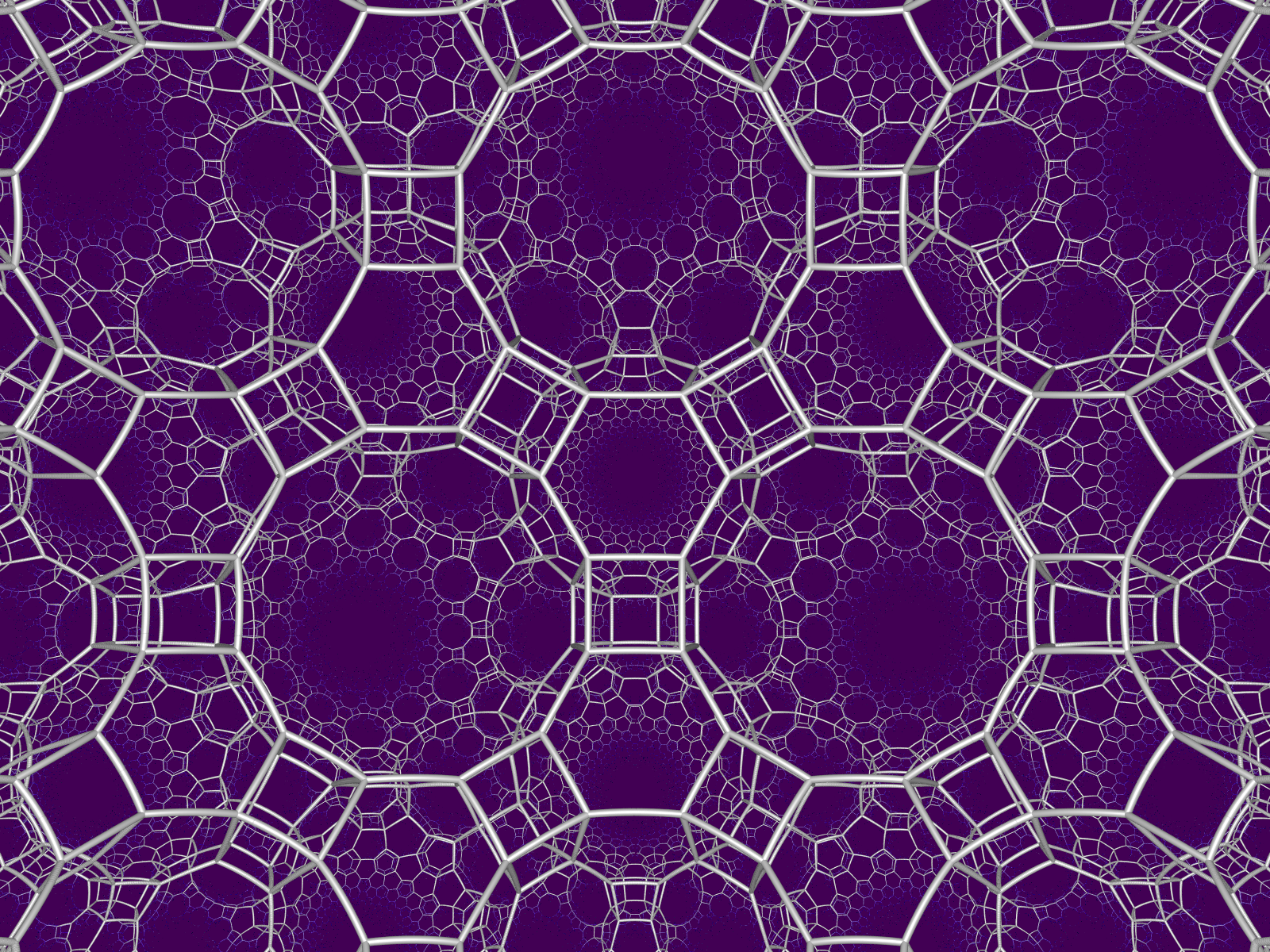

=== Runcinated order-6 hexagonal tiling honeycomb ===
Runcinated order-6 hexagonal tiling honeycomb
Type	Paracompact uniform honeycomb
Schläfli symbol	t_{0,3}{6,3,6}
Coxeter diagram	↔
Cells	{6,3} {}×{6}
Faces	triangle {3} square {4} hexagon {6}
Vertex figure	triangular antiprism
Coxeter groups	$2\times\overline{Z}_3$, [[6,3,6]]
Properties	Vertex-transitive, edge-transitive

The runcinated order-6 hexagonal tiling honeycomb, t_{0,3}{6,3,6}, has hexagonal tiling and hexagonal prism cells, with a triangular antiprism vertex figure.

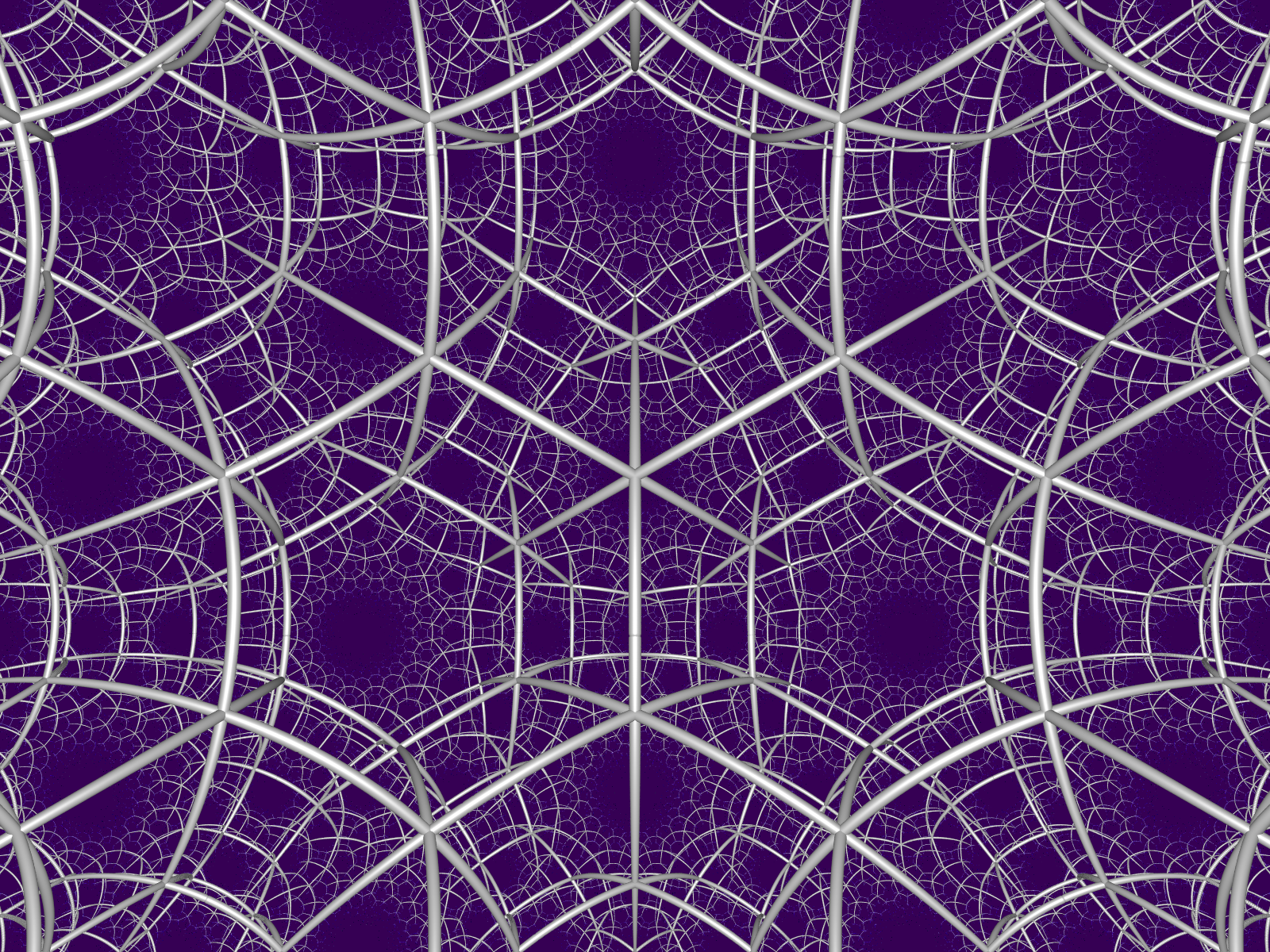

It is analogous to the 2D hyperbolic rhombihexahexagonal tiling, rr{6,6}, with square and hexagonal faces:

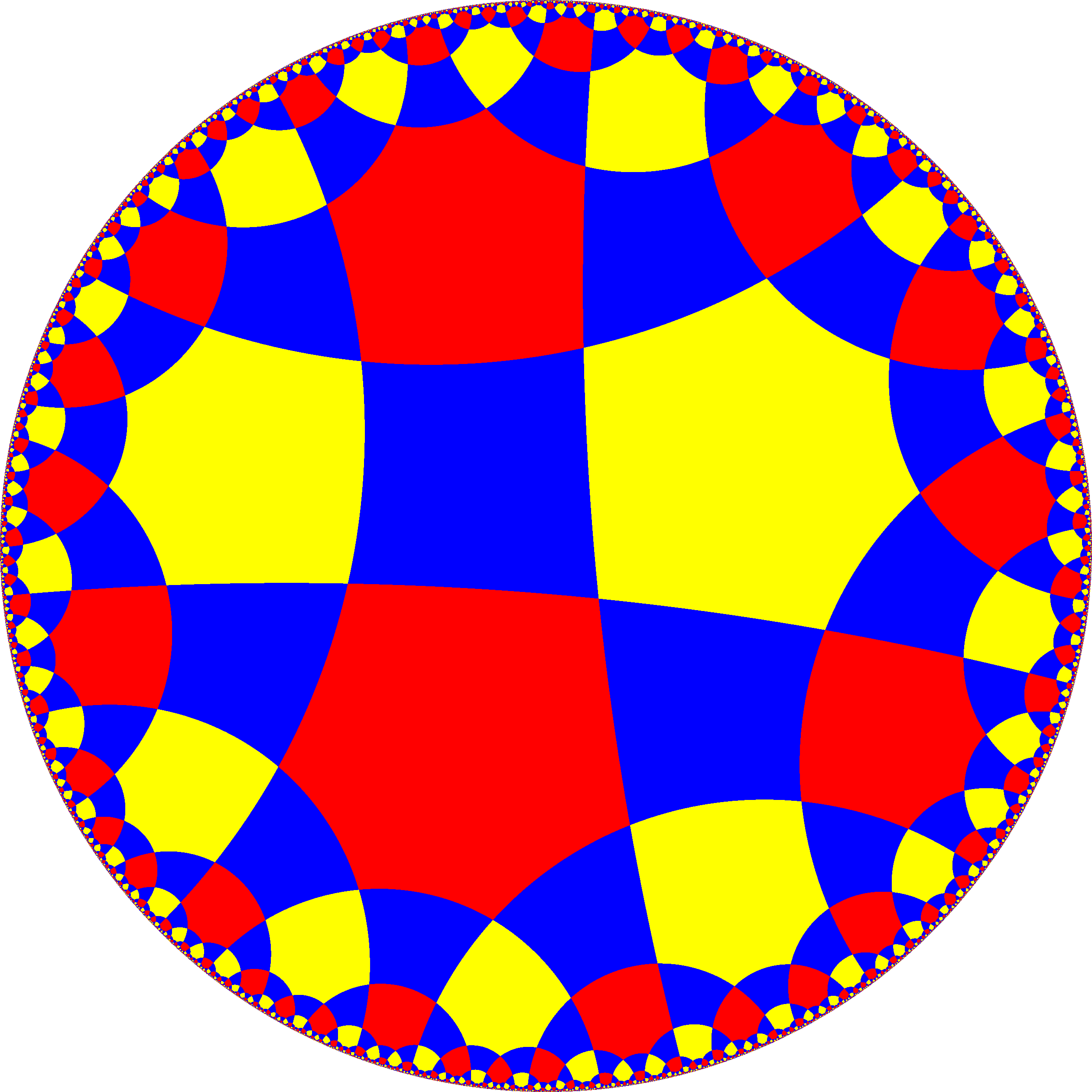

=== Runcitruncated order-6 hexagonal tiling honeycomb ===
Runcitruncated order-6 hexagonal tiling honeycomb
Type	Paracompact uniform honeycomb
Schläfli symbol	t_{0,1,3}{6,3,6}
Coxeter diagram	
Cells	t{6,3} rr{6,3} {}x{6} {}x{12}
Faces	triangle {3} square {4} hexagon {6} dodecagon {12}
Vertex figure	isosceles-trapezoidal pyramid
Coxeter groups	$\overline{Z}_3$, [6,3,6]
Properties	Vertex-transitive

The runcitruncated order-6 hexagonal tiling honeycomb, t_{0,1,3}{6,3,6}, has truncated hexagonal tiling, rhombitrihexagonal tiling, hexagonal prism, and dodecagonal prism cells, with an isosceles-trapezoidal pyramid vertex figure.

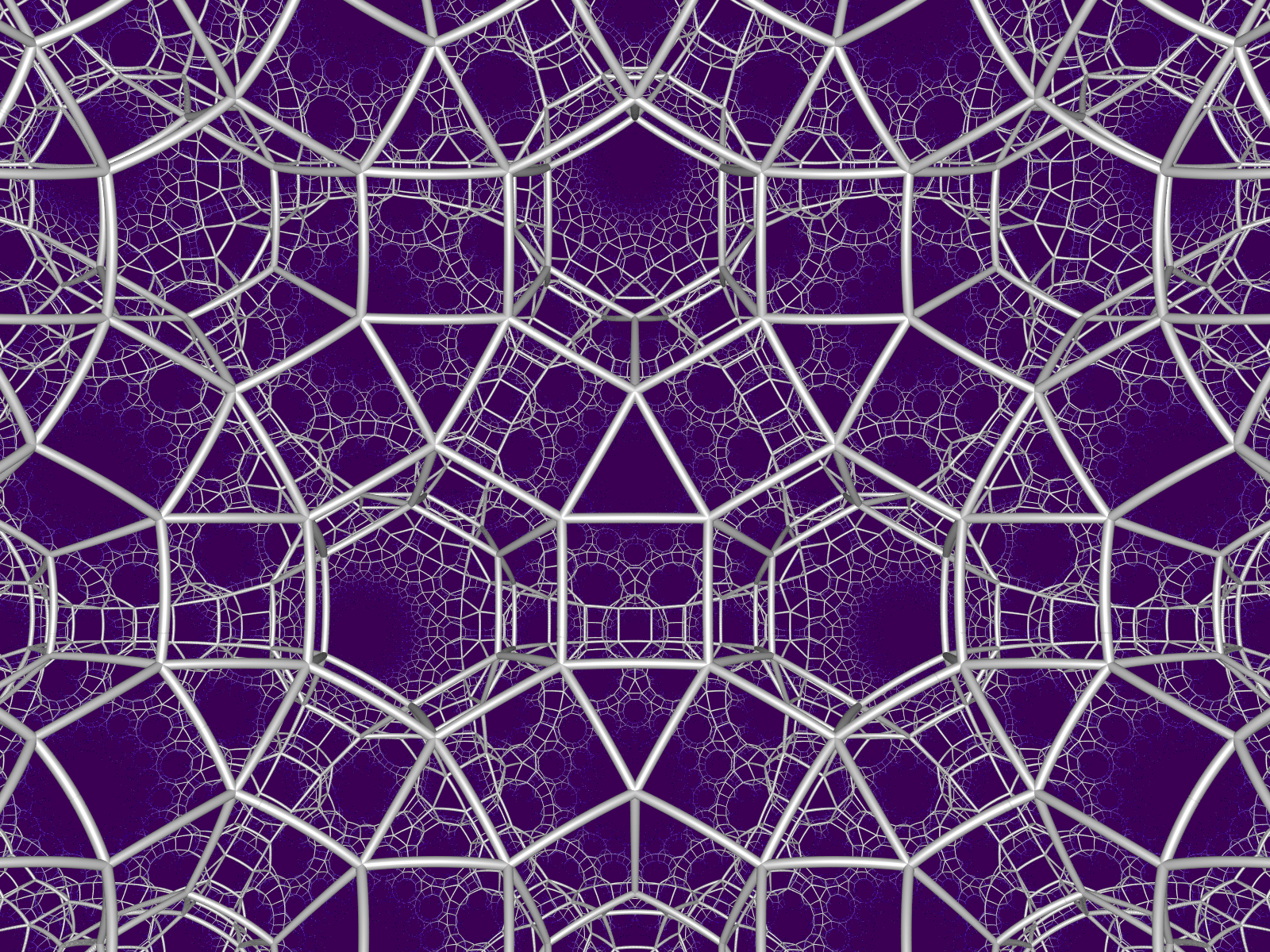

=== Omnitruncated order-6 hexagonal tiling honeycomb ===
Omnitruncated order-6 hexagonal tiling honeycomb
Type	Paracompact uniform honeycomb
Schläfli symbol	t_{0,1,2,3}{6,3,6}
Coxeter diagram	
Cells	tr{6,3} {}x{12}
Faces	square {4} hexagon {6} dodecagon {12}
Vertex figure	phyllic disphenoid
Coxeter groups	$2\times\overline{Z}_3$, [[6,3,6]]
Properties	Vertex-transitive

The omnitruncated order-6 hexagonal tiling honeycomb, t_{0,1,2,3}{6,3,6}, has truncated trihexagonal tiling and dodecagonal prism cells, with a phyllic disphenoid vertex figure.

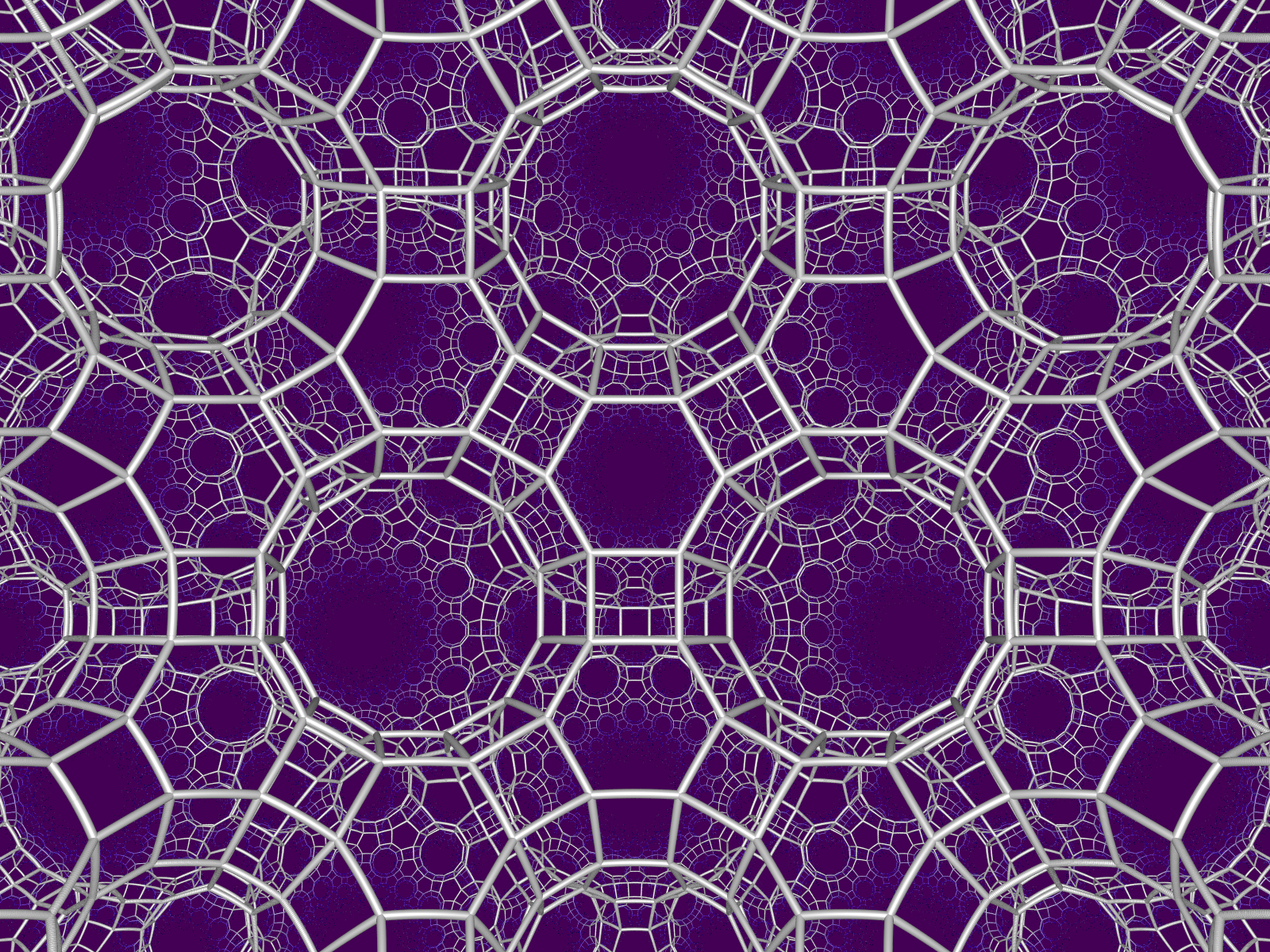

=== Alternated order-6 hexagonal tiling honeycomb ===
Alternated order-6 hexagonal tiling honeycomb
Type	Paracompact uniform honeycomb
Schläfli symbols	h{6,3,6}
Coxeter diagrams	↔
Cells	{3,6} {3^{[3]}}
Faces	triangle {3}
Vertex figure	hexagonal tiling
Coxeter groups	$\overline{VP}_3$, [6,3^{[3]}]
Properties	Regular, quasiregular

The alternated order-6 hexagonal tiling honeycomb is a lower-symmetry construction of the regular triangular tiling honeycomb, ↔. It contains triangular tiling facets in a hexagonal tiling vertex figure.

=== Cantic order-6 hexagonal tiling honeycomb ===
Cantic order-6 hexagonal tiling honeycomb
Type	Paracompact uniform honeycomb
Schläfli symbols	h_{2}{6,3,6}
Coxeter diagrams	↔
Cells	t{3,6}, r{6,3} h_{2}{6,3}
Faces	triangle {3} hexagon {6}
Vertex figure	triangular prism
Coxeter groups	$\overline{VP}_3$, [6,3^{[3]}]
Properties	Vertex-transitive, edge-transitive

The cantic order-6 hexagonal tiling honeycomb is a lower-symmetry construction of the rectified triangular tiling honeycomb, ↔, with trihexagonal tiling and hexagonal tiling facets in a triangular prism vertex figure.

=== Runcic order-6 hexagonal tiling honeycomb ===
Runcic order-6 hexagonal tiling honeycomb
Type	Paracompact uniform honeycomb
Schläfli symbols	h_{3}{6,3,6}
Coxeter diagrams	↔
Cells	rr{3,6}, {6,3} {3^{[3]}}, {3}x{}
Faces	triangle {3} square {4} hexagon {6}
Vertex figure	triangular cupola
Coxeter groups	$\overline{VP}_3$, [6,3^{[3]}]
Properties	Vertex-transitive

The runcic hexagonal tiling honeycomb, h_{3}{6,3,6},, or, has hexagonal tiling, rhombitrihexagonal tiling, triangular tiling, and triangular prism facets, with a triangular cupola vertex figure.

=== Runicantic order-6 hexagonal tiling honeycomb ===
Runcicantic order-6 hexagonal tiling honeycomb
Type	Paracompact uniform honeycomb
Schläfli symbols	h_{2,3}{6,3,6}
Coxeter diagrams	↔
Cells	tr{6,3}, t{6,3} h_{2}{6,3}, {}x{3}
Faces	triangle {3} square {4} hexagon {6} dodecagon {12}
Vertex figure	rectangular pyramid
Coxeter groups	$\overline{VP}_3$, [6,3^{[3]}]
Properties	Vertex-transitive

The runcicantic order-6 hexagonal tiling honeycomb, h_{2,3}{6,3,6},, or, contains truncated trihexagonal tiling, truncated hexagonal tiling, trihexagonal tiling, and triangular prism facets, with a rectangular pyramid vertex figure.

== See also ==
- Convex uniform honeycombs in hyperbolic space
- Regular tessellations of hyperbolic 3-space
- Paracompact uniform honeycombs
