= Order-3-6 heptagonal honeycomb =

Order-3-6 heptagonal honeycomb
Type	Regular honeycomb
Schläfli symbol	{7,3,6} {7,3^{[3]}}
Coxeter diagram	=
Cells	{7,3}
Faces	{7}
Vertex figure	{3,6}
Dual	{6,3,7}
Coxeter group	[7,3,6] [7,3^{[3]}]
Properties	Regular

In the geometry of hyperbolic 3-space, the order-3-6 heptagonal honeycomb a regular space-filling tessellation (or honeycomb). Each infinite cell consists of a heptagonal tiling whose vertices lie on a 2-hypercycle, each of which has a limiting circle on the ideal sphere.

== Geometry ==
The Schläfli symbol of the order-3-6 heptagonal honeycomb is {7,3,6}, with six heptagonal tilings meeting at each edge. The vertex figure of this honeycomb is a triangular tiling, {3,6}.

It has a quasiregular construction,, which can be seen as alternately colored cells.

Poincaré disk model	Ideal surface

== Related polytopes and honeycombs ==
It is a part of a series of regular polytopes and honeycombs with {p,3,6} Schläfli symbol, and triangular tiling vertex figures.

Hyperbolic uniform honeycombs: {p,3,6} and {p,3^{[3]}}
Form	Paracompact				Noncompact		
Name	{3,3,6} {3,3^{[3]}}	{4,3,6} {4,3^{[3]}}	{5,3,6} {5,3^{[3]}}	{6,3,6} {6,3^{[3]}}	{7,3,6} {7,3^{[3]}}	{8,3,6} {8,3^{[3]}}	... {∞,3,6} {∞,3^{[3]}}
Image							
Cells	{3,3}	{4,3}	{5,3}	{6,3}	{7,3}	{8,3}	{∞,3}

=== Order-3-6 octagonal honeycomb ===
Order-3-6 octagonal honeycomb
Type	Regular honeycomb
Schläfli symbol	{8,3,6} {8,3^{[3]}}
Coxeter diagram	=
Cells	{8,3}
Faces	Octagon {8}
Vertex figure	triangular tiling {3,6}
Dual	{6,3,8}
Coxeter group	[8,3,6] [8,3^{[3]}]
Properties	Regular

In the geometry of hyperbolic 3-space, the order-3-6 octagonal honeycomb a regular space-filling tessellation (or honeycomb). Each infinite cell consists of an order-6 octagonal tiling whose vertices lie on a 2-hypercycle, each of which has a limiting circle on the ideal sphere.

The Schläfli symbol of the order-3-6 octagonal honeycomb is {8,3,6}, with six octagonal tilings meeting at each edge. The vertex figure of this honeycomb is a triangular tiling, {3,6}.

It has a quasiregular construction,, which can be seen as alternately colored cells.

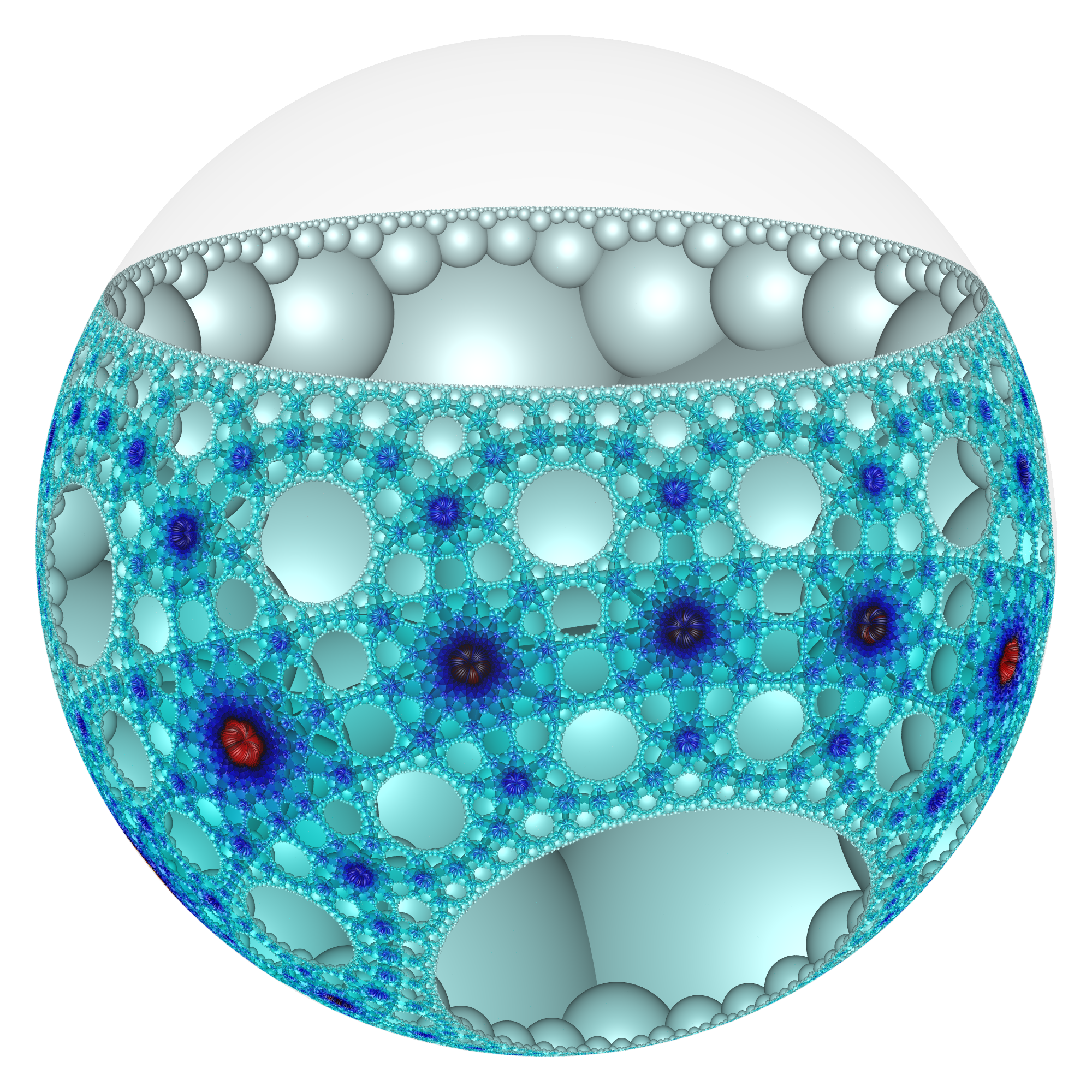
Poincaré disk model

=== Order-3-6 apeirogonal honeycomb ===
Order-3-6 apeirogonal honeycomb
Type	Regular honeycomb
Schläfli symbol	{∞,3,6} {∞,3^{[3]}}
Coxeter diagram	=
Cells	{∞,3}
Faces	Apeirogon {∞}
Vertex figure	triangular tiling {3,6}
Dual	{6,3,∞}
Coxeter group	[∞,3,6] [∞,3^{[3]}]
Properties	Regular

In the geometry of hyperbolic 3-space, the order-3-6 apeirogonal honeycomb a regular space-filling tessellation (or honeycomb). Each infinite cell consists of an order-3 apeirogonal tiling whose vertices lie on a 2-hypercycle, each of which has a limiting circle on the ideal sphere.

The Schläfli symbol of the order-3-6 apeirogonal honeycomb is {∞,3,6}, with six order-3 apeirogonal tilings meeting at each edge. The vertex figure of this honeycomb is a triangular tiling, {3,6}.

Poincaré disk model	Ideal surface

It has a quasiregular construction,, which can be seen as alternately colored cells.

== See also ==
- Convex uniform honeycombs in hyperbolic space
- List of regular polytopes
