= Order-3-7 hexagonal honeycomb =

Order-3-7 hexagonal honeycomb
Poincaré disk model
Type	Regular honeycomb
Schläfli symbol	{6,3,7}
Coxeter diagrams	
Cells	{6,3}
Faces	{6}
Edge figure	{7}
Vertex figure	{3,7}
Dual	{7,3,6}
Coxeter group	[6,3,7]
Properties	Regular

In the geometry of hyperbolic 3-space, the order-3-7 hexagonal honeycomb or (6,3,7 honeycomb) a regular space-filling tessellation (or honeycomb) with Schläfli symbol {6,3,7}.

== Geometry ==
All vertices are ultra-ideal (existing beyond the ideal boundary) with seven hexagonal tilings existing around each edge and with an order-7 triangular tiling vertex figure.

Ideal surface
Rendered intersection of honeycomb with the ideal plane in Poincaré half-space model	Closeup

== Related polytopes and honeycombs ==
It a part of a sequence of regular polychora and honeycombs with hexagonal tiling cells.

{6,3,p} honeycombs
Space	H^{3}						
Form	Paracompact				Noncompact		
Name	{6,3,3}	{6,3,4}	{6,3,5}	{6,3,6}	{6,3,7}	{6,3,8}	... {6,3,∞}
Coxeter							
Image							
Vertex figure {3,p}	{3,3}	{3,4}	{3,5}	{3,6}	{3,7}	{3,8}	{3,∞}

=== Order-3-8 hexagonal honeycomb ===
Order-3-8 hexagonal honeycomb
Type	Regular honeycomb
Schläfli symbols	{6,3,8} {6,(3,4,3)}
Coxeter diagrams	=
Cells	{6,3}
Faces	{6}
Edge figure	{8}
Vertex figure	{3,8} {(3,4,3)}
Dual	{8,3,6}
Coxeter group	[6,3,8] [6,((3,4,3))]
Properties	Regular

In the geometry of hyperbolic 3-space, the order-3-8 hexagonal honeycomb or (6,3,8 honeycomb) is a regular space-filling tessellation (or honeycomb) with Schläfli symbol {6,3,8}. It has eight hexagonal tilings, {6,3}, around each edge. All vertices are ultra-ideal (existing beyond the ideal boundary) with infinitely many hexagonal tilings existing around each vertex in an order-8 triangular tiling vertex arrangement.

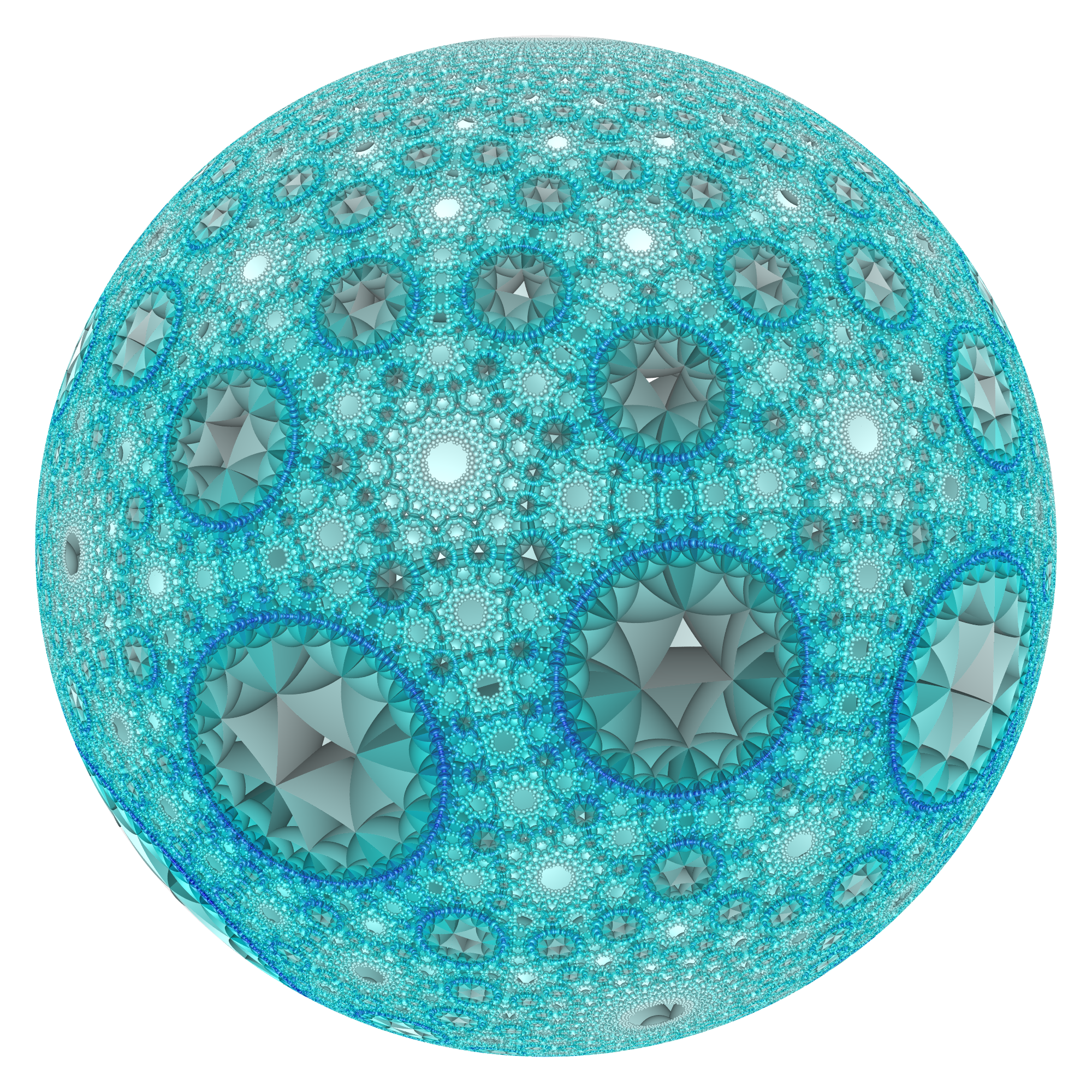
Poincaré disk model

It has a second construction as a uniform honeycomb, Schläfli symbol {6,(3,4,3)}, Coxeter diagram,, with alternating types or colors of tetrahedral cells. In Coxeter notation the half symmetry is [6,3,8,1^{+}] = [6,((3,4,3))].

=== Order-3-infinite hexagonal honeycomb ===
Order-3-infinite hexagonal honeycomb
Type	Regular honeycomb
Schläfli symbols	{6,3,∞} {6,(3,∞,3)}
Coxeter diagrams	↔ ↔
Cells	{6,3}
Faces	{6}
Edge figure	{∞}
Vertex figure	{3,∞}, {(3,∞,3)}
Dual	{∞,3,6}
Coxeter group	[6,3,∞] [6,((3,∞,3))]
Properties	Regular

In the geometry of hyperbolic 3-space, the order-3-infinite hexagonal honeycomb or (6,3,∞ honeycomb) is a regular space-filling tessellation (or honeycomb) with Schläfli symbol {6,3,∞}. It has infinitely many hexagonal tiling {6,3} around each edge. All vertices are ultra-ideal (existing beyond the ideal boundary) with infinitely many hexagonal tilings existing around each vertex in an infinite-order triangular tiling vertex arrangement.

Poincaré disk model	Ideal surface

It has a second construction as a uniform honeycomb, Schläfli symbol {6,(3,∞,3)}, Coxeter diagram,, with alternating types or colors of hexagonal tiling cells.

== See also ==
- Convex uniform honeycombs in hyperbolic space
- List of regular polytopes
- Infinite-order dodecahedral honeycomb
