= Order-5 dodecahedral honeycomb =

Regular tiling of hyperbolic 3-space

Order-5 dodecahedral honeycomb
Perspective projection view from center of Poincaré disk model
Type	Hyperbolic regular honeycomb Uniform hyperbolic honeycomb
Schläfli symbol	{5,3,5} t_{0}{5,3,5}
Coxeter-Dynkin diagram	
Cells	{5,3} (regular dodecahedron)
Faces	{5} (pentagon)
Edge figure	{5} (pentagon)
Vertex figure	icosahedron
Dual	Self-dual
Coxeter group	$\overline{K}_3$, [5,3,5]
Properties	Regular

In hyperbolic geometry, the order-5 dodecahedral honeycomb is one of four compact regular space-filling tessellations (or honeycombs) in hyperbolic 3-space. With Schläfli symbol {5,3,5}, it has five dodecahedral cells around each edge, and each vertex is surrounded by twenty dodecahedra. Its vertex figure is an icosahedron.

A geometric honeycomb is a space-filling of polyhedral or higher-dimensional cells, so that there are no gaps. It is an example of the more general mathematical tiling or tessellation in any number of dimensions.

Honeycombs are usually constructed in ordinary Euclidean ("flat") space, like the convex uniform honeycombs. They may also be constructed in non-Euclidean spaces, such as hyperbolic uniform honeycombs. Any finite uniform polytope can be projected to its circumsphere to form a uniform honeycomb in spherical space.

== Description ==
The dihedral angle of a Euclidean regular dodecahedron is ~116.6°, so no more than three of them can fit around an edge in Euclidean 3-space. In hyperbolic space, however, the dihedral angle is smaller than it is in Euclidean space, and depends on the size of the figure; the smallest possible dihedral angle is 60°, for an ideal hyperbolic regular dodecahedron with infinitely long edges. The dodecahedra in this dodecahedral honeycomb are sized so that all of their dihedral angles are exactly 72°.

== Images ==
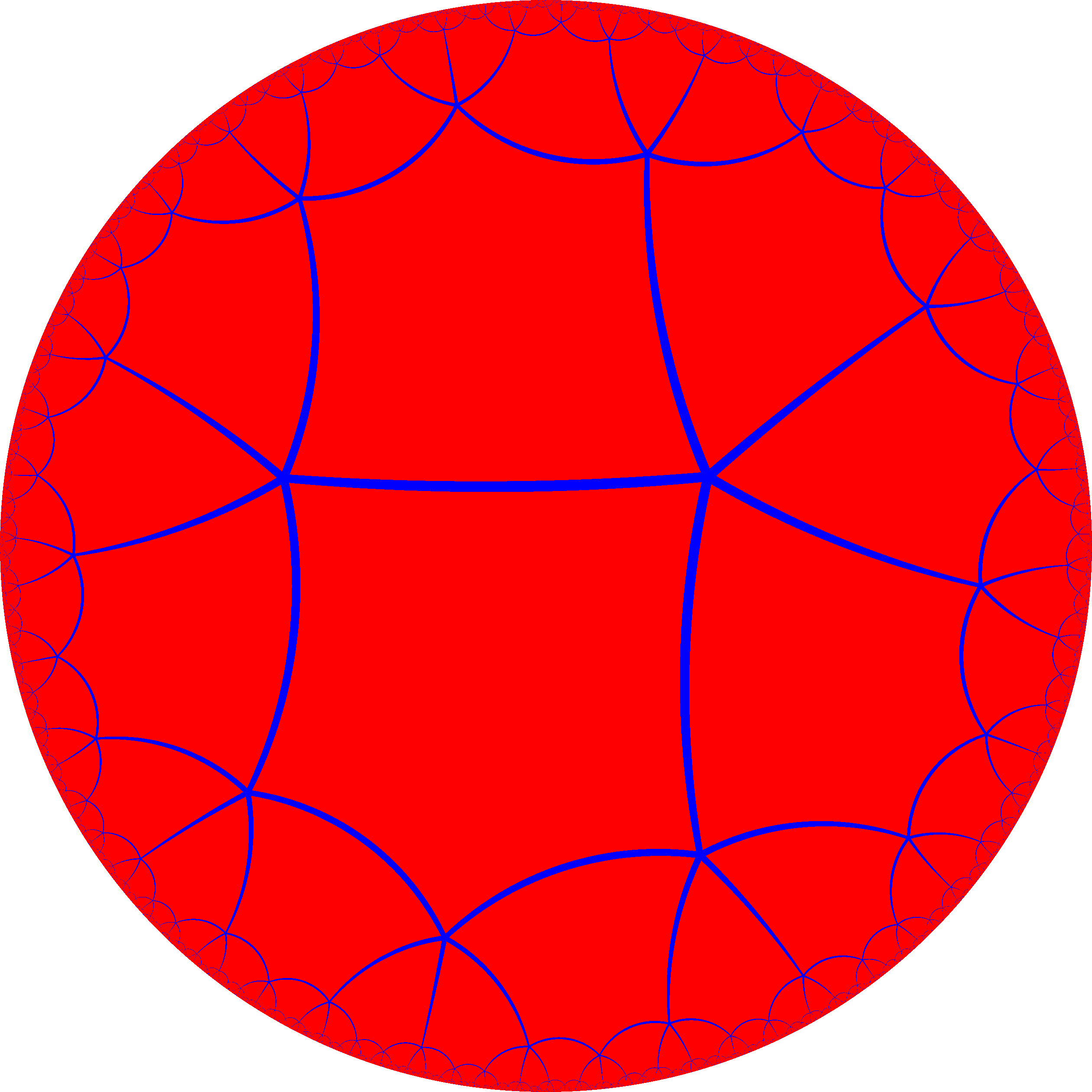
It is analogous to the 2D hyperbolic order-5 pentagonal tiling, {5,5}

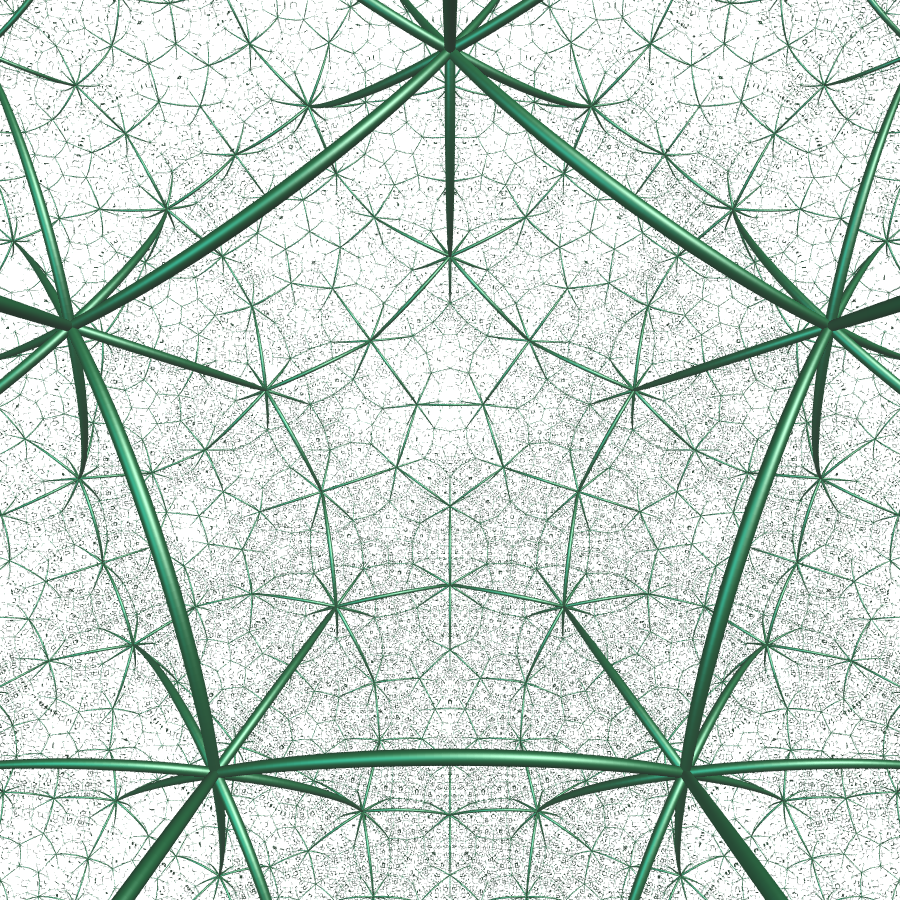

== Related polytopes and honeycombs ==
There are four regular compact honeycombs in 3D hyperbolic space:

Four regular compact honeycombs in H^{3}
{5,3,4}	{4,3,5}	{3,5,3}	{5,3,5}

There is another honeycomb in hyperbolic 3-space called the order-4 dodecahedral honeycomb, {5,3,4}, which has only four dodecahedra per edge. These honeycombs are also related to the 120-cell which can be considered as a honeycomb in positively curved space (the surface of a 4-dimensional sphere), with three dodecahedra on each edge, {5,3,3}. Lastly the dodecahedral ditope, {5,3,2} exists on a 3-sphere, with 2 hemispherical cells.

There are nine uniform honeycombs in the [5,3,5] Coxeter group family, including this regular form. Also the bitruncated form, t_{1,2}{5,3,5},, of this honeycomb has all truncated icosahedron cells.

[5,3,5] family honeycombs
{5,3,5}	r{5,3,5}	t{5,3,5}	rr{5,3,5}	t_{0,3}{5,3,5}
	2t{5,3,5}	tr{5,3,5}	t_{0,1,3}{5,3,5}	t_{0,1,2,3}{5,3,5}

The Seifert–Weber space is a compact manifold that can be formed as a quotient space of the order-5 dodecahedral honeycomb.

This honeycomb is a part of a sequence of polychora and honeycombs with icosahedron vertex figures:

{p,3,5} polytopes
Space	S^{3}	H^{3}					
Form	Finite	Compact		Paracompact	Noncompact		
Name	{3,3,5}	{4,3,5}	{5,3,5}	{6,3,5}	{7,3,5}	{8,3,5}	... {∞,3,5}
Image							
Cells	{3,3}	{4,3}	{5,3}	{6,3}	{7,3}	{8,3}	{∞,3}

This honeycomb is a part of a sequence of regular polytopes and honeycombs with dodecahedral cells:

{5,3,p} polytopes
Space	S^{3}	H^{3}					
Form	Finite	Compact		Paracompact	Noncompact		
Name	{5,3,3}	{5,3,4}	{5,3,5}	{5,3,6}	{5,3,7}	{5,3,8}	... {5,3,∞}
Image							
Vertex figure	{3,3}	{3,4}	{3,5}	{3,6}	{3,7}	{3,8}	{3,∞}

{p,3,p} regular honeycombs
Space	S^{3}	Euclidean E^{3}	H^{3}				
Form	Finite	Affine	Compact	Paracompact	Noncompact		
Name	{3,3,3}	{4,3,4}	{5,3,5}	{6,3,6}	{7,3,7}	{8,3,8}	...{∞,3,∞}
Image							
Cells	{3,3}	{4,3}	{5,3}	{6,3}	{7,3}	{8,3}	{∞,3}
Vertex figure	{3,3}	{3,4}	{3,5}	{3,6}	{3,7}	{3,8}	{3,∞}

=== Rectified order-5 dodecahedral honeycomb ===
Rectified order-5 dodecahedral honeycomb
Type	Uniform honeycombs in hyperbolic space
Schläfli symbol	r{5,3,5} t_{1}{5,3,5}
Coxeter diagram	
Cells	r{5,3} {3,5}
Faces	triangle {3} pentagon {5}
Vertex figure	pentagonal prism
Coxeter group	$\overline{K}_3$, [5,3,5]
Properties	Vertex-transitive, edge-transitive

The rectified order-5 dodecahedral honeycomb,, has alternating icosahedron and icosidodecahedron cells, with a pentagonal prism vertex figure.

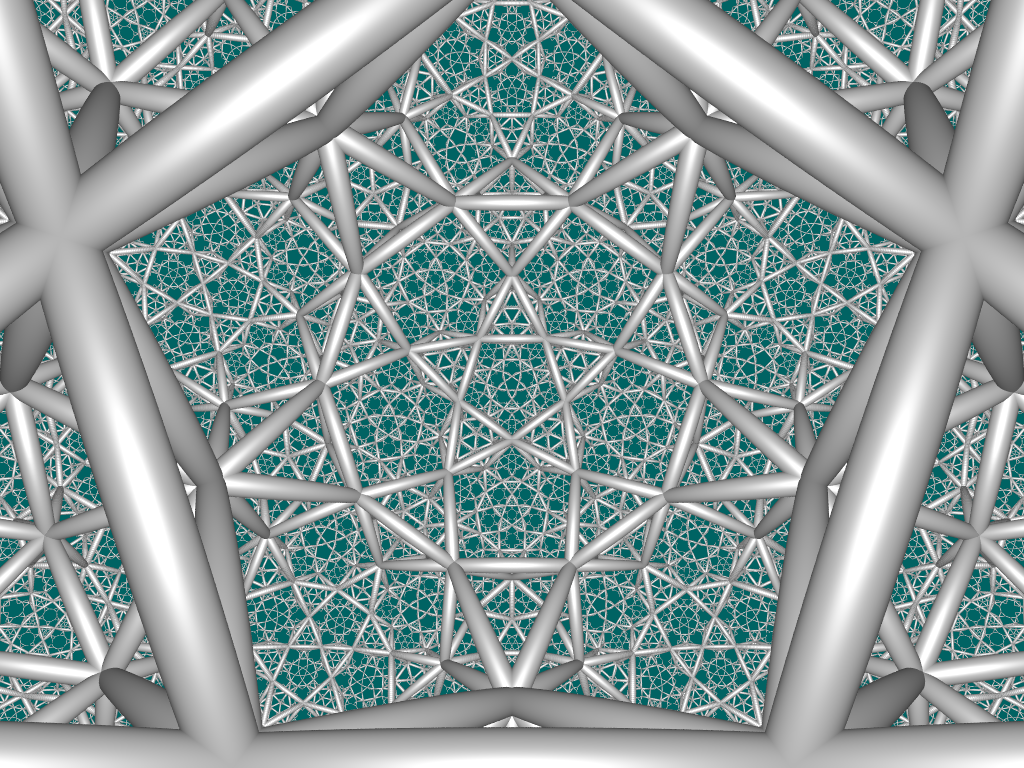

==== Related tilings and honeycomb ====
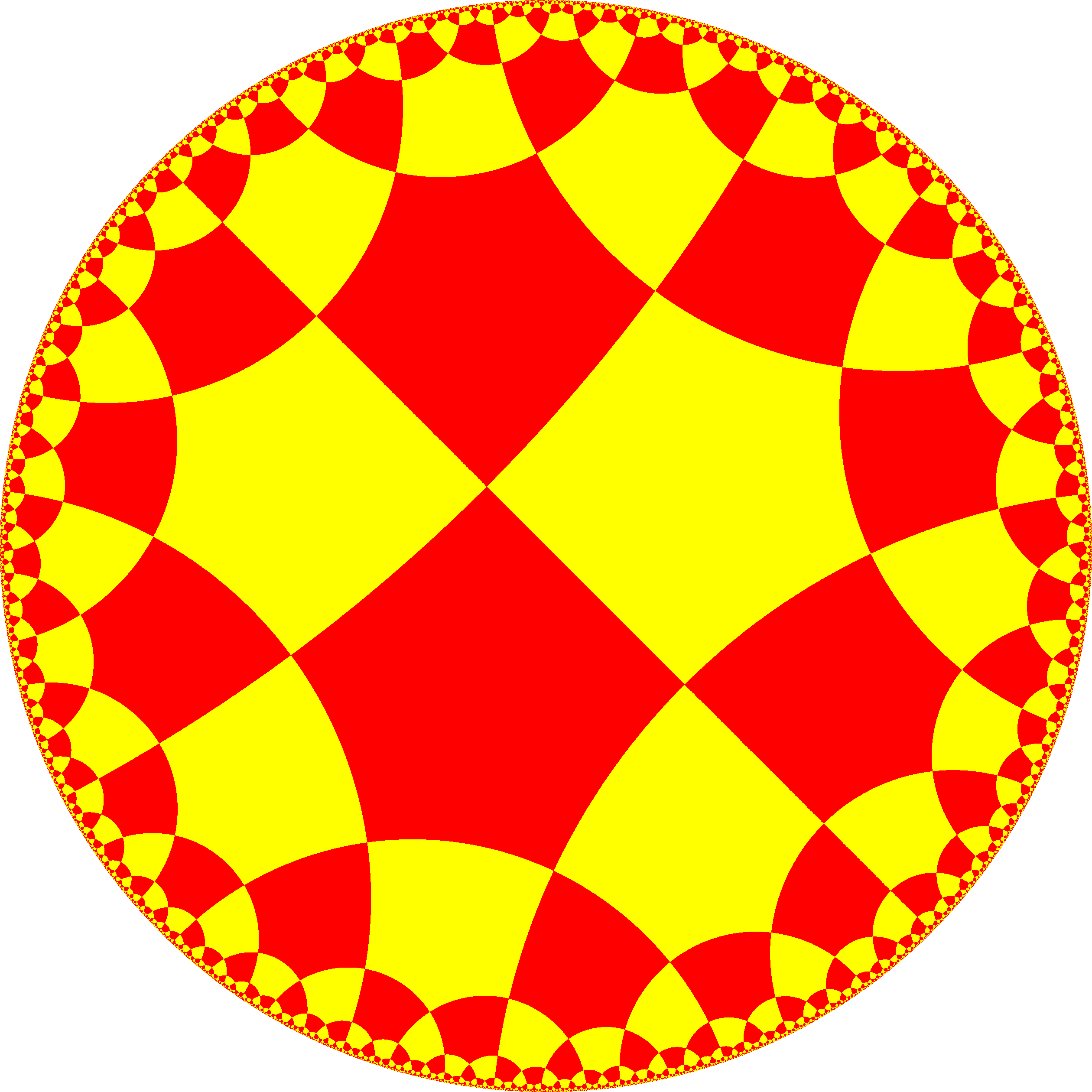
It can be seen as analogous to the 2D hyperbolic order-4 pentagonal tiling, r{5,5}

There are four rectified compact regular honeycombs:

Four rectified regular compact honeycombs in H^{3}
Image				
Symbols	r{5,3,4}	r{4,3,5}	r{3,5,3}	r{5,3,5}
Vertex figure				

r{p,3,5}
Space	S^{3}	H^{3}				
Form	Finite	Compact		Paracompact	Noncompact	
Name	r{3,3,5}	r{4,3,5}	r{5,3,5}	r{6,3,5}	r{7,3,5}	... r{∞,3,5}
Image						
Cells {3,5}	r{3,3}	r{4,3}	r{5,3}	r{6,3}	r{7,3}	r{∞,3}

=== Truncated order-5 dodecahedral honeycomb ===
Truncated order-5 dodecahedral honeycomb
Type	Uniform honeycombs in hyperbolic space
Schläfli symbol	t{5,3,5} t_{0,1}{5,3,5}
Coxeter diagram	
Cells	t{5,3} {3,5}
Faces	triangle {3} decagon {10}
Vertex figure	pentagonal pyramid
Coxeter group	$\overline{K}_3$, [5,3,5]
Properties	Vertex-transitive

The truncated order-5 dodecahedral honeycomb,, has icosahedron and truncated dodecahedron cells, with a pentagonal pyramid vertex figure.

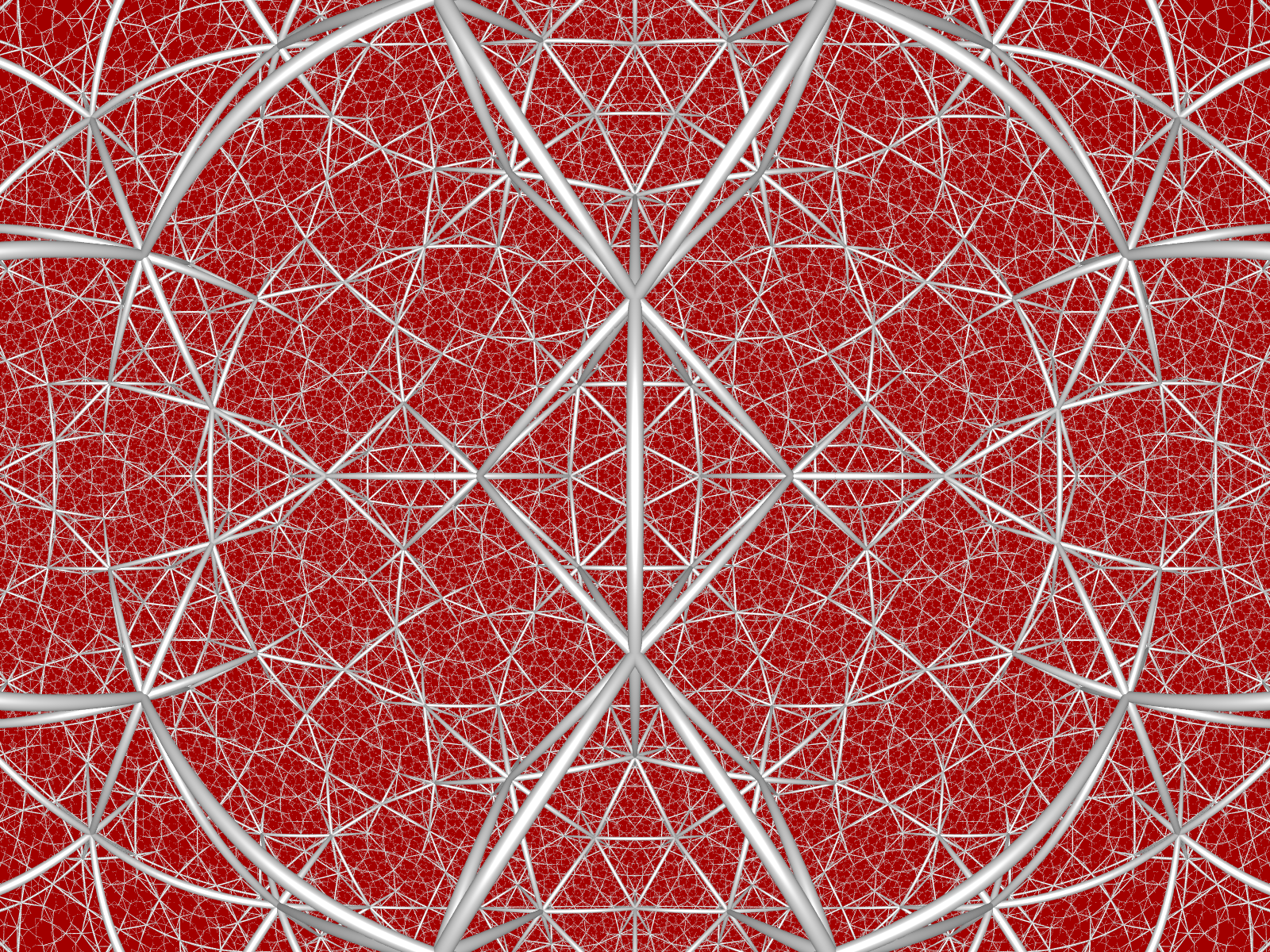

==== Related honeycombs ====
Four truncated regular compact honeycombs in H^{3}
Image				
Symbols	t{5,3,4}	t{4,3,5}	t{3,5,3}	t{5,3,5}
Vertex figure				

=== Bitruncated order-5 dodecahedral honeycomb ===
Bitruncated order-5 dodecahedral honeycomb
Type	Uniform honeycombs in hyperbolic space
Schläfli symbol	2t{5,3,5} t_{1,2}{5,3,5}
Coxeter diagram	
Cells	t{3,5}
Faces	pentagon {5} hexagon {6}
Vertex figure	tetragonal disphenoid
Coxeter group	$2\times\overline{K}_3$, [[5,3,5]]
Properties	Vertex-transitive, edge-transitive, cell-transitive

The bitruncated order-5 dodecahedral honeycomb,, has truncated icosahedron cells, with a tetragonal disphenoid vertex figure.

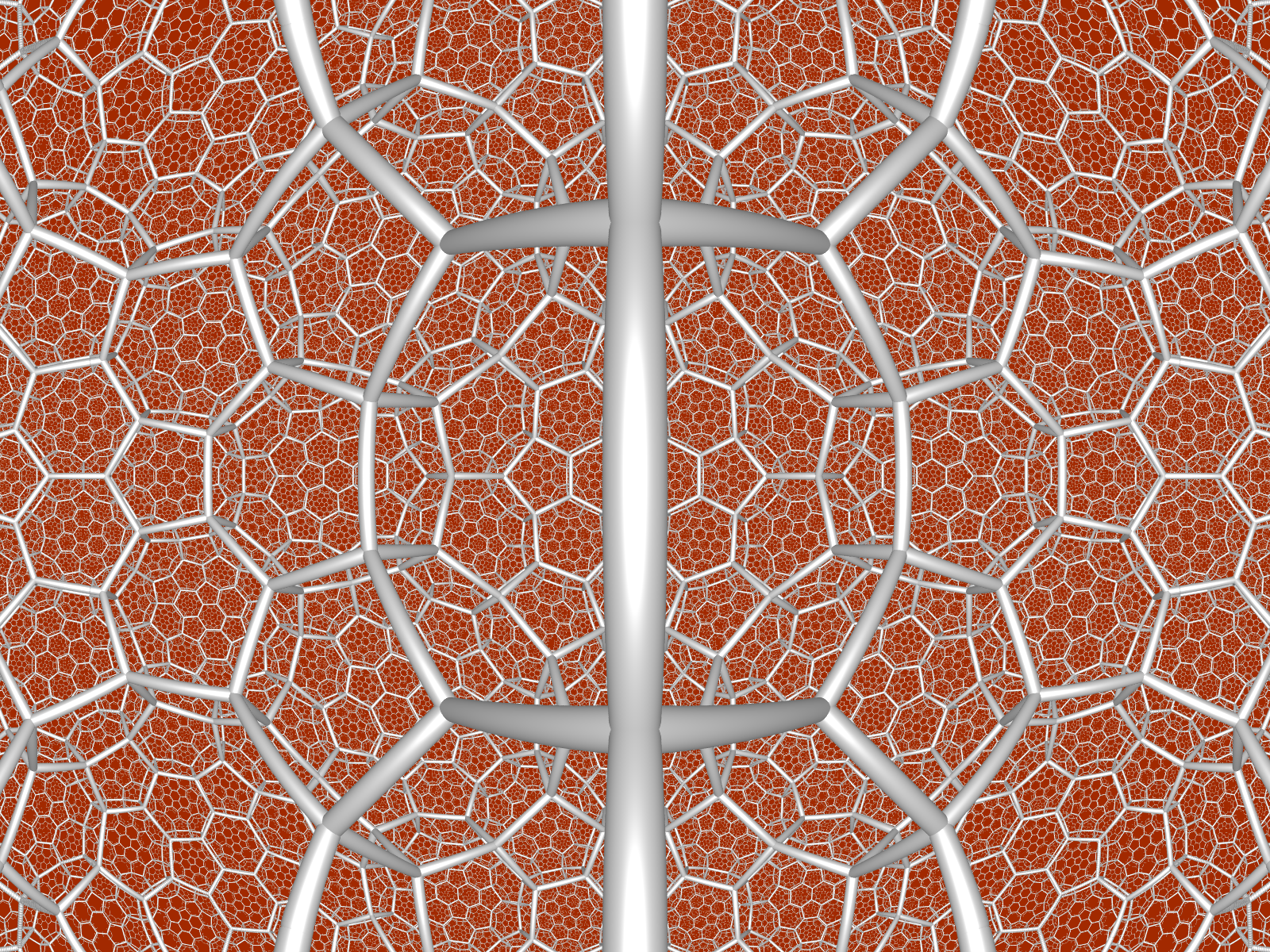

==== Related honeycombs ====
Three bitruncated compact honeycombs in H^{3}
Image			
Symbols	2t{4,3,5}	2t{3,5,3}	2t{5,3,5}
Vertex figure			

=== Cantellated order-5 dodecahedral honeycomb ===
Cantellated order-5 dodecahedral honeycomb
Type	Uniform honeycombs in hyperbolic space
Schläfli symbol	rr{5,3,5} t_{0,2}{5,3,5}
Coxeter diagram	
Cells	rr{5,3} r{3,5} {}x{5}
Faces	triangle {3} square {4} pentagon {5}
Vertex figure	wedge
Coxeter group	$\overline{K}_3$, [5,3,5]
Properties	Vertex-transitive

The cantellated order-5 dodecahedral honeycomb,, has rhombicosidodecahedron, icosidodecahedron, and pentagonal prism cells, with a wedge vertex figure.

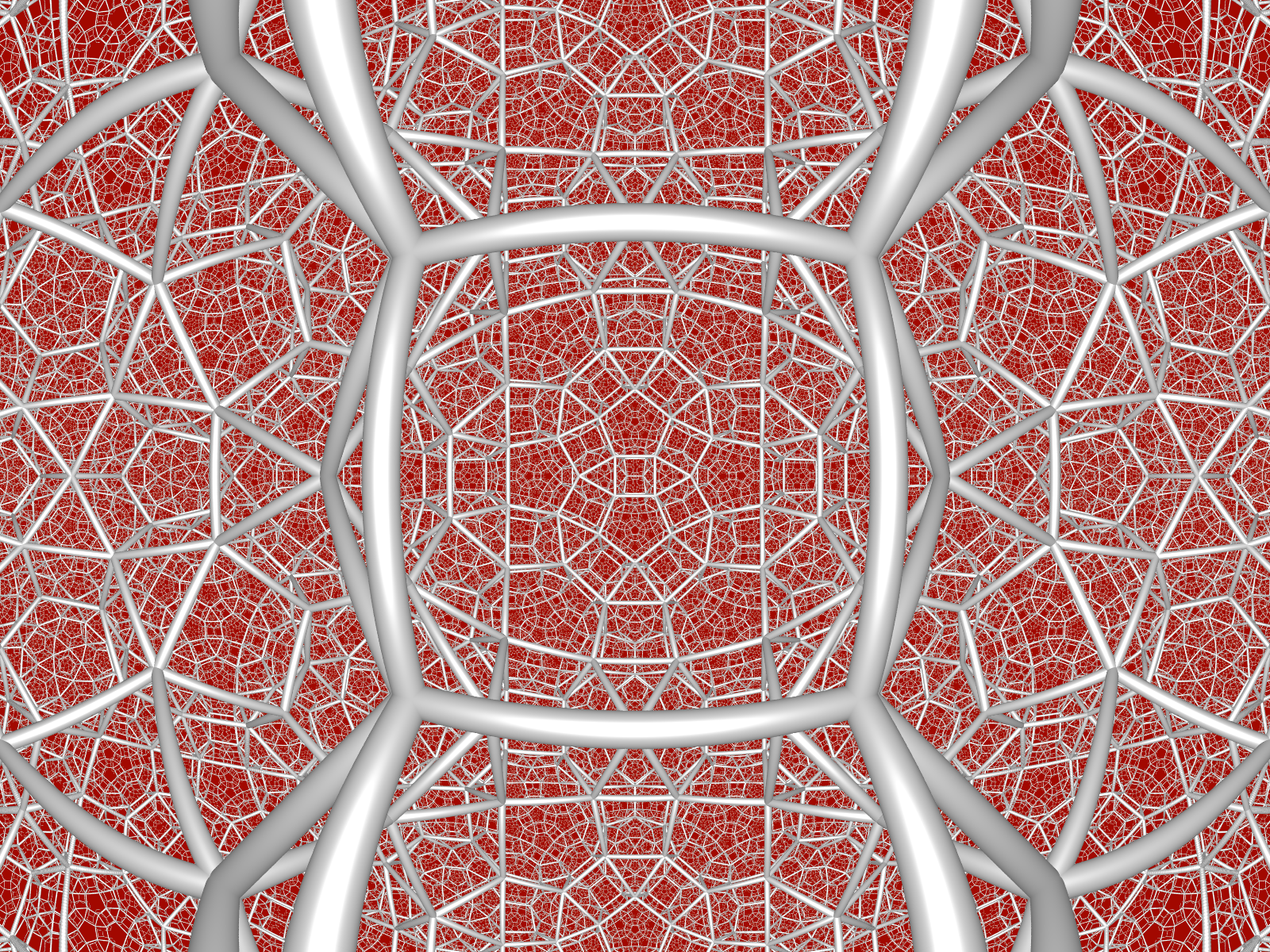

==== Related honeycombs ====
Four cantellated regular compact honeycombs in H^{3}

Image				
Symbols	rr{5,3,4}	rr{4,3,5}	rr{3,5,3}	rr{5,3,5}
Vertex figure				

=== Cantitruncated order-5 dodecahedral honeycomb ===
Cantitruncated order-5 dodecahedral honeycomb
Type	Uniform honeycombs in hyperbolic space
Schläfli symbol	tr{5,3,5} t_{0,1,2}{5,3,5}
Coxeter diagram	
Cells	tr{5,3} t{3,5} {}x{5}
Faces	square {4} pentagon {5} hexagon {6} decagon {10}
Vertex figure	mirrored sphenoid
Coxeter group	$\overline{K}_3$, [5,3,5]
Properties	Vertex-transitive

The cantitruncated order-5 dodecahedral honeycomb,, has truncated icosidodecahedron, truncated icosahedron, and pentagonal prism cells, with a mirrored sphenoid vertex figure.

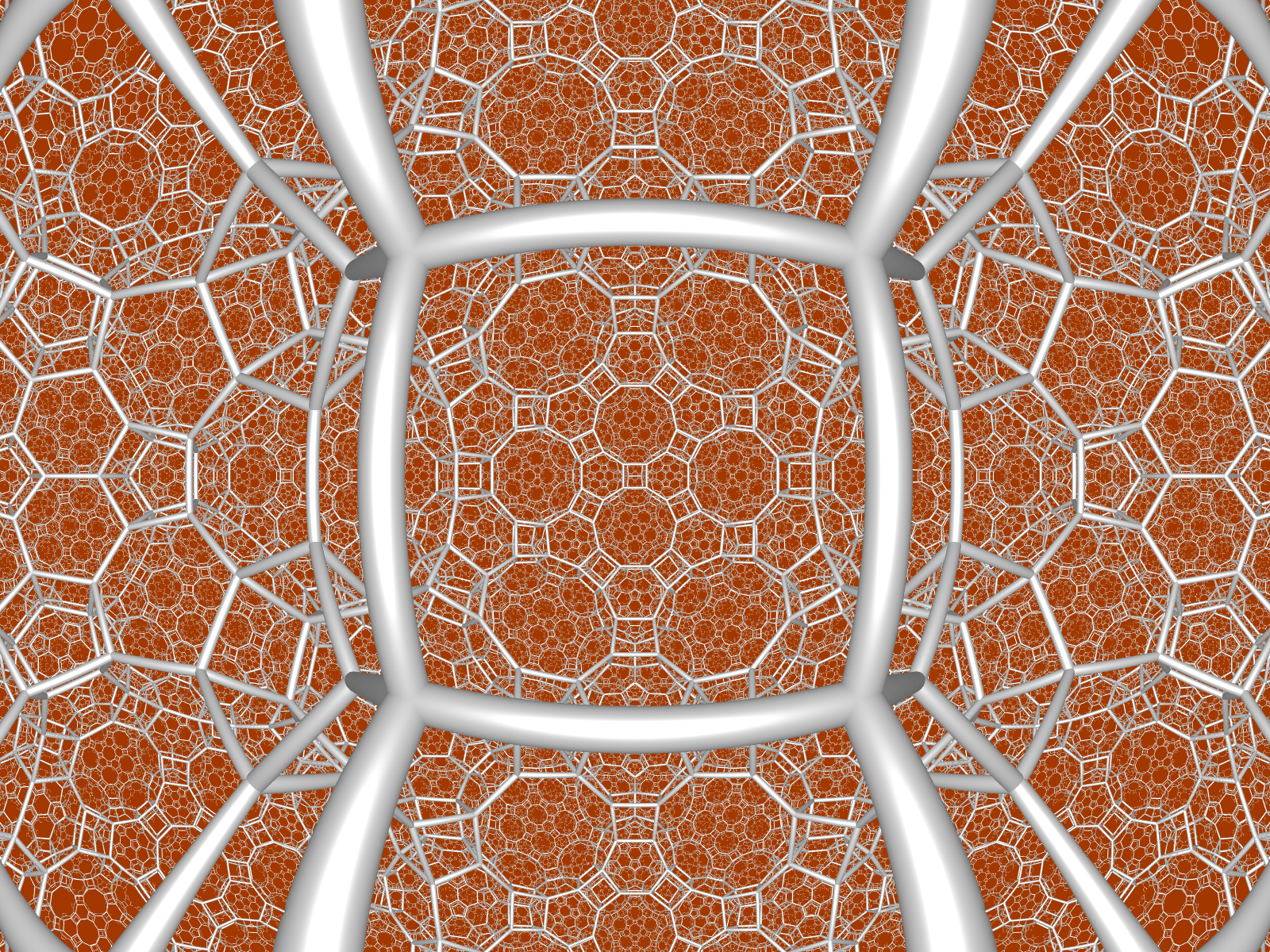

==== Related honeycombs ====
Four cantitruncated regular compact honeycombs in H^{3}
Image				
Symbols	tr{5,3,4}	tr{4,3,5}	tr{3,5,3}	tr{5,3,5}
Vertex figure				

=== Runcinated order-5 dodecahedral honeycomb ===
Runcinated order-5 dodecahedral honeycomb
Type	Uniform honeycombs in hyperbolic space
Schläfli symbol	t_{0,3}{5,3,5}
Coxeter diagram	
Cells	{5,3} {}x{5}
Faces	square {4} pentagon {5}
Vertex figure	triangular antiprism
Coxeter group	$2\times\overline{K}_3$, [[5,3,5]]
Properties	Vertex-transitive, edge-transitive

The runcinated order-5 dodecahedral honeycomb,, has dodecahedron and pentagonal prism cells, with a triangular antiprism vertex figure.

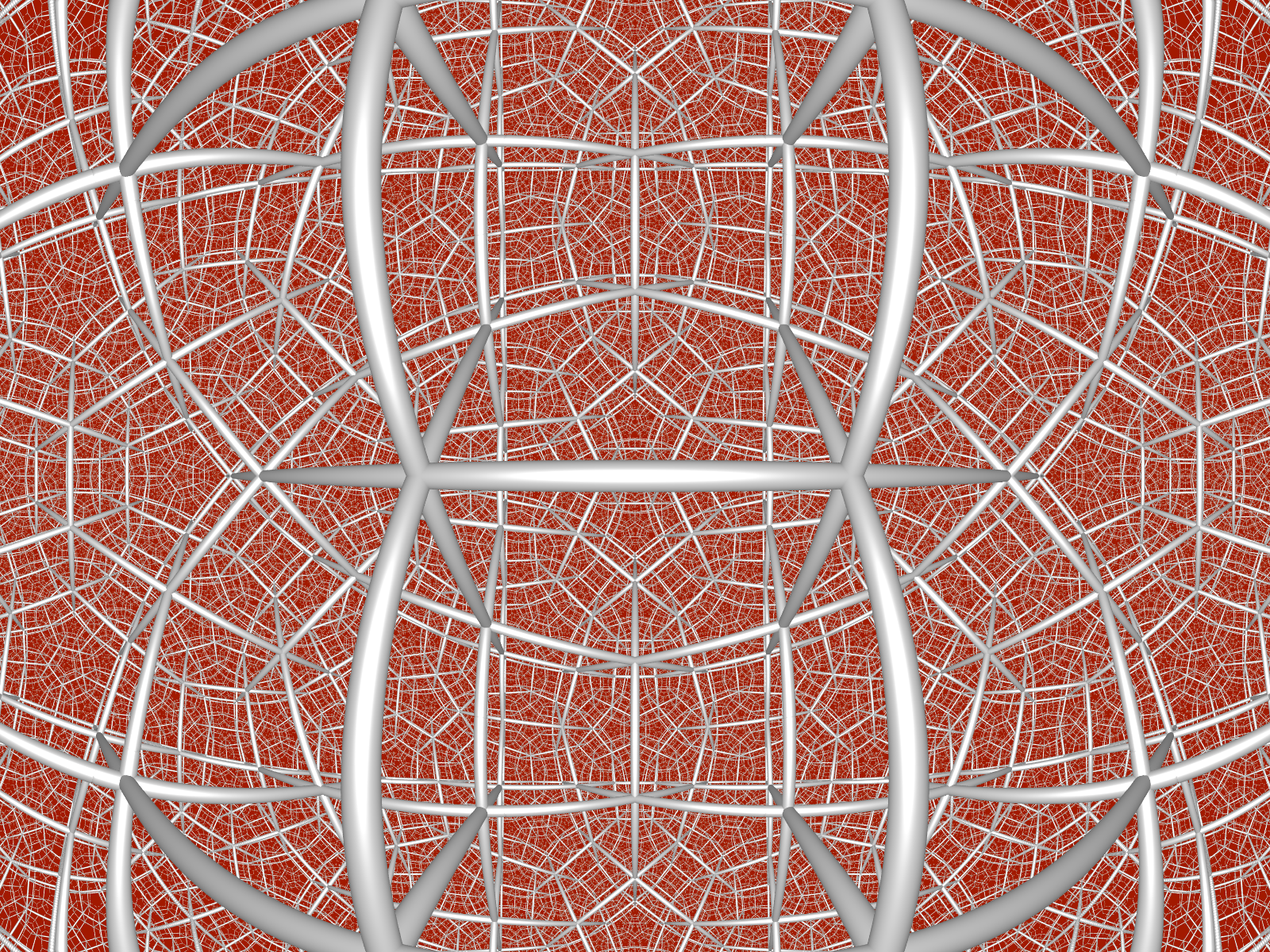

==== Related honeycombs ====
Three runcinated regular compact honeycombs in H^{3}
Image			
Symbols	t_{0,3}{4,3,5}	t_{0,3}{3,5,3}	t_{0,3}{5,3,5}
Vertex figure			

=== Runcitruncated order-5 dodecahedral honeycomb ===
Runcitruncated order-5 dodecahedral honeycomb
Type	Uniform honeycombs in hyperbolic space
Schläfli symbol	t_{0,1,3}{5,3,5}
Coxeter diagram	
Cells	t{5,3} rr{5,3} {}x{5} {}x{10}
Faces	triangle {3} square {4} pentagon {5} decagon {10}
Vertex figure	isosceles-trapezoidal pyramid
Coxeter group	$\overline{K}_3$, [5,3,5]
Properties	Vertex-transitive

The runcitruncated order-5 dodecahedral honeycomb,, has truncated dodecahedron, rhombicosidodecahedron, pentagonal prism, and decagonal prism cells, with an isosceles-trapezoidal pyramid vertex figure.

The runcicantellated order-5 dodecahedral honeycomb is equivalent to the runcitruncated order-5 dodecahedral honeycomb.

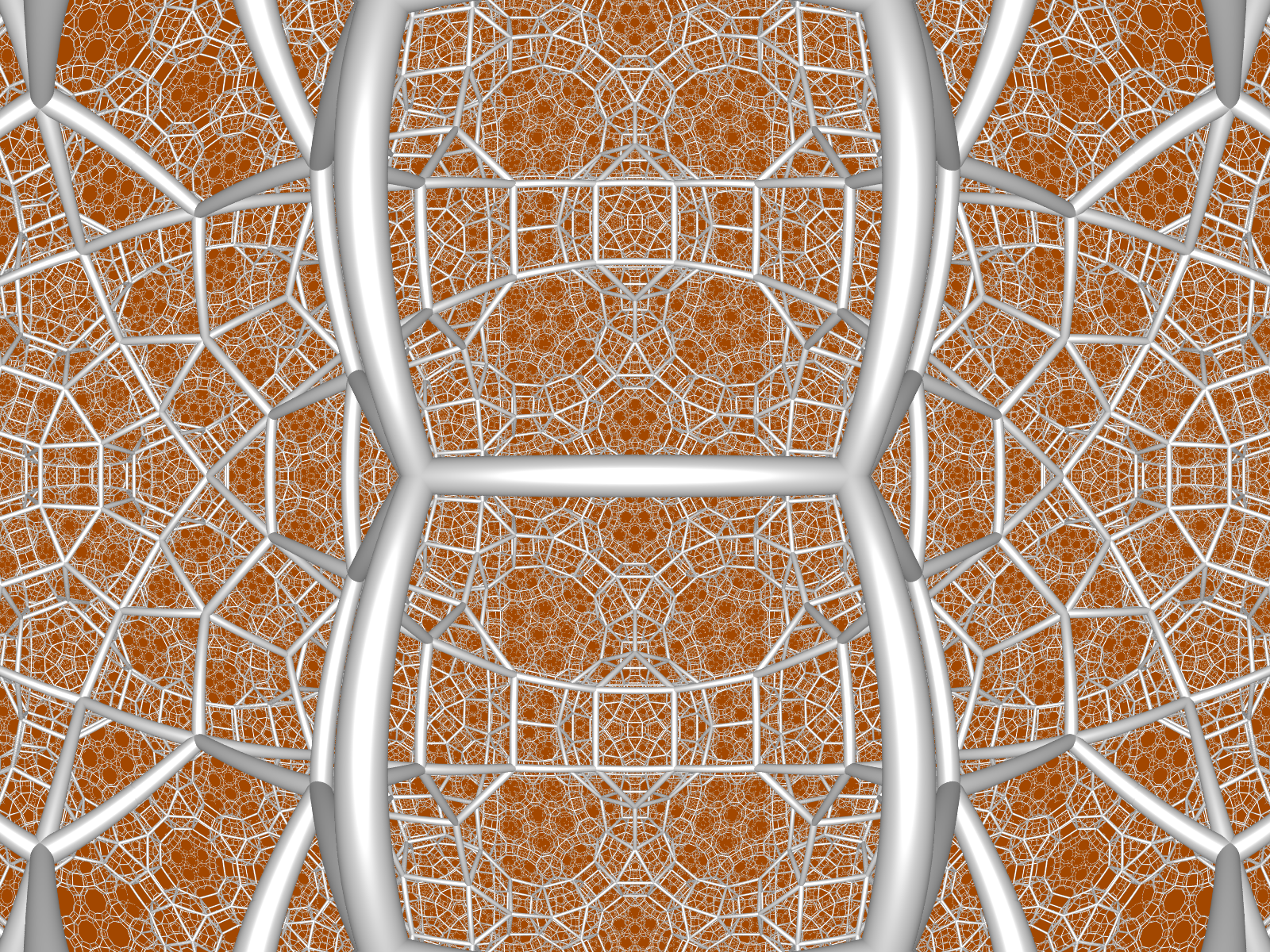

==== Related honeycombs ====
Four runcitruncated regular compact honeycombs in H^{3}

Image				
Symbols	t_{0,1,3}{5,3,4}	t_{0,1,3}{4,3,5}	t_{0,1,3}{3,5,3}	t_{0,1,3}{5,3,5}
Vertex figure				

=== Omnitruncated order-5 dodecahedral honeycomb ===
Omnitruncated order-5 dodecahedral honeycomb
Type	Uniform honeycombs in hyperbolic space
Schläfli symbol	t_{0,1,2,3}{5,3,5}
Coxeter diagram	
Cells	tr{5,3} {}x{10}
Faces	square {4} hexagon {6} decagon {10}
Vertex figure	phyllic disphenoid
Coxeter group|$2\times\overline{K}_3$, [[5,3,5]]
Properties	Vertex-transitive

The omnitruncated order-5 dodecahedral honeycomb,, has truncated icosidodecahedron and decagonal prism cells, with a phyllic disphenoid vertex figure.

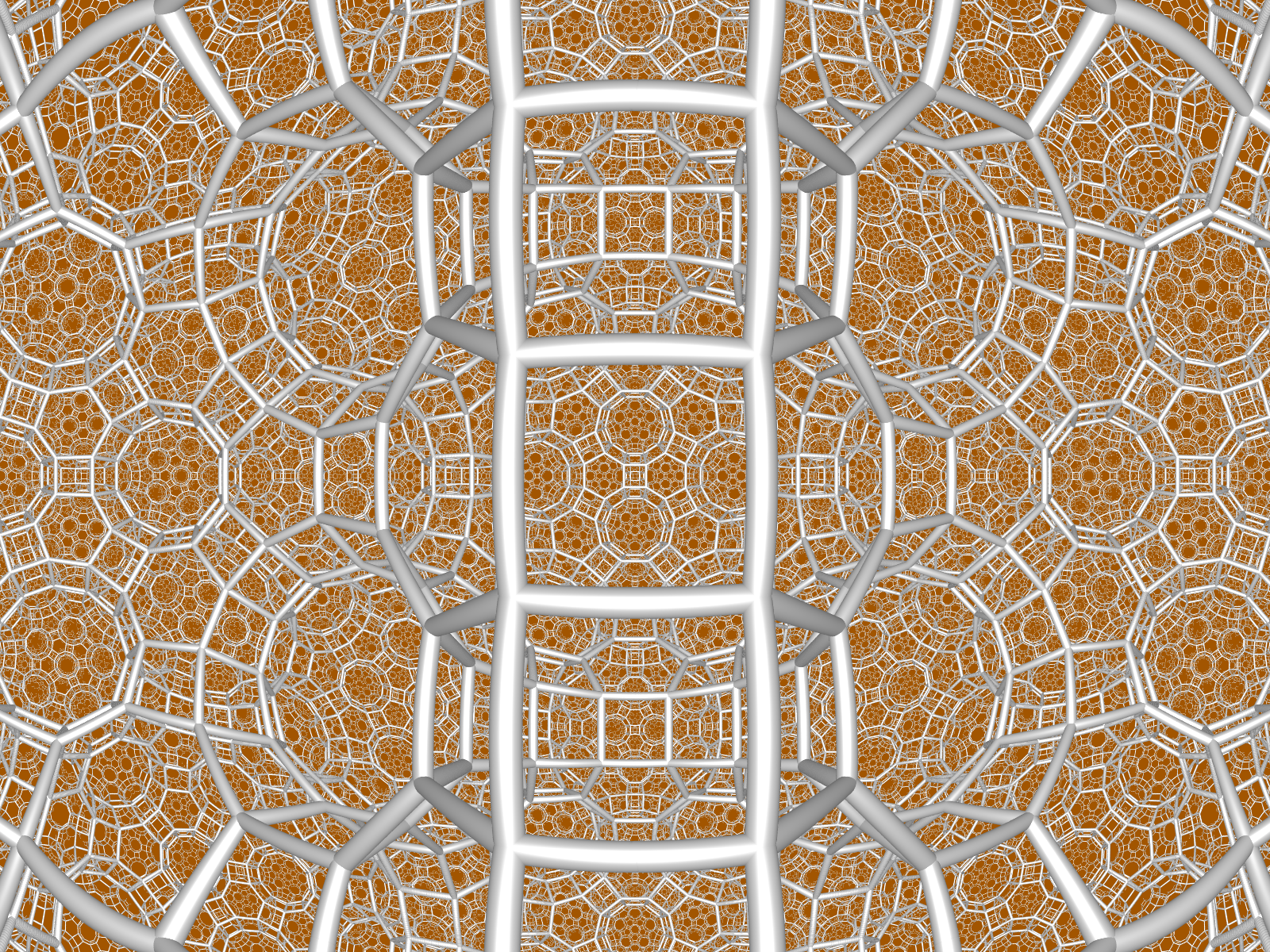

==== Related honeycombs ====
Three omnitruncated regular compact honeycombs in H^{3}

Image			
Symbols	t_{0,1,2,3}{4,3,5}	t_{0,1,2,3}{3,5,3}	t_{0,1,2,3}{5,3,5}
Vertex figure			

== See also ==
- Convex uniform honeycombs in hyperbolic space
- Regular tessellations of hyperbolic 3-space
- 57-cell - An abstract regular polychoron which shared the {5,3,5} symbol.
