= Order-3-5 heptagonal honeycomb =

Order-3-5 heptagonal honeycomb
Type	Regular honeycomb
Schläfli symbol	{7,3,5}
Coxeter diagram	
Cells	{7,3}
Faces	Heptagon {7}
Vertex figure	icosahedron {3,5}
Dual	{5,3,7}
Coxeter group	[7,3,5]
Properties	Regular

In the geometry of hyperbolic 3-space, the order-3-5 heptagonal honeycomb a regular space-filling tessellation (or honeycomb). Each infinite cell consists of a heptagonal tiling whose vertices lie on a 2-hypercycle, each of which has a limiting circle on the ideal sphere.

== Geometry ==
The Schläfli symbol of the order-3-5 heptagonal honeycomb is {7,3,5}, with five heptagonal tilings meeting at each edge. The vertex figure of this honeycomb is an icosahedron, {3,5}.

Poincaré disk model (vertex centered)	Ideal surface

== Related polytopes and honeycombs ==
It is a part of a series of regular polytopes and honeycombs with {p,3,5} Schläfli symbol, and icosahedral vertex figures.

{p,3,5} polytopes
Space	S^{3}	H^{3}					
Form	Finite	Compact		Paracompact	Noncompact		
Name	{3,3,5}	{4,3,5}	{5,3,5}	{6,3,5}	{7,3,5}	{8,3,5}	... {∞,3,5}
Image							
Cells	{3,3}	{4,3}	{5,3}	{6,3}	{7,3}	{8,3}	{∞,3}

=== Order-3-5 octagonal honeycomb ===
Order-3-5 octagonal honeycomb
Type	Regular honeycomb
Schläfli symbol	{8,3,5}
Coxeter diagram	
Cells	{8,3}
Faces	Octagon {8}
Vertex figure	icosahedron {3,5}
Dual	{5,3,8}
Coxeter group	[8,3,5]
Properties	Regular

In the geometry of hyperbolic 3-space, the order-3-5 octagonal honeycomb a regular space-filling tessellation (or honeycomb). Each infinite cell consists of an octagonal tiling whose vertices lie on a 2-hypercycle, each of which has a limiting circle on the ideal sphere.

The Schläfli symbol of the order 3-5 heptagonal honeycomb is {8,3,5}, with five octagonal tilings meeting at each edge. The vertex figure of this honeycomb is an icosahedron, {3,5}.

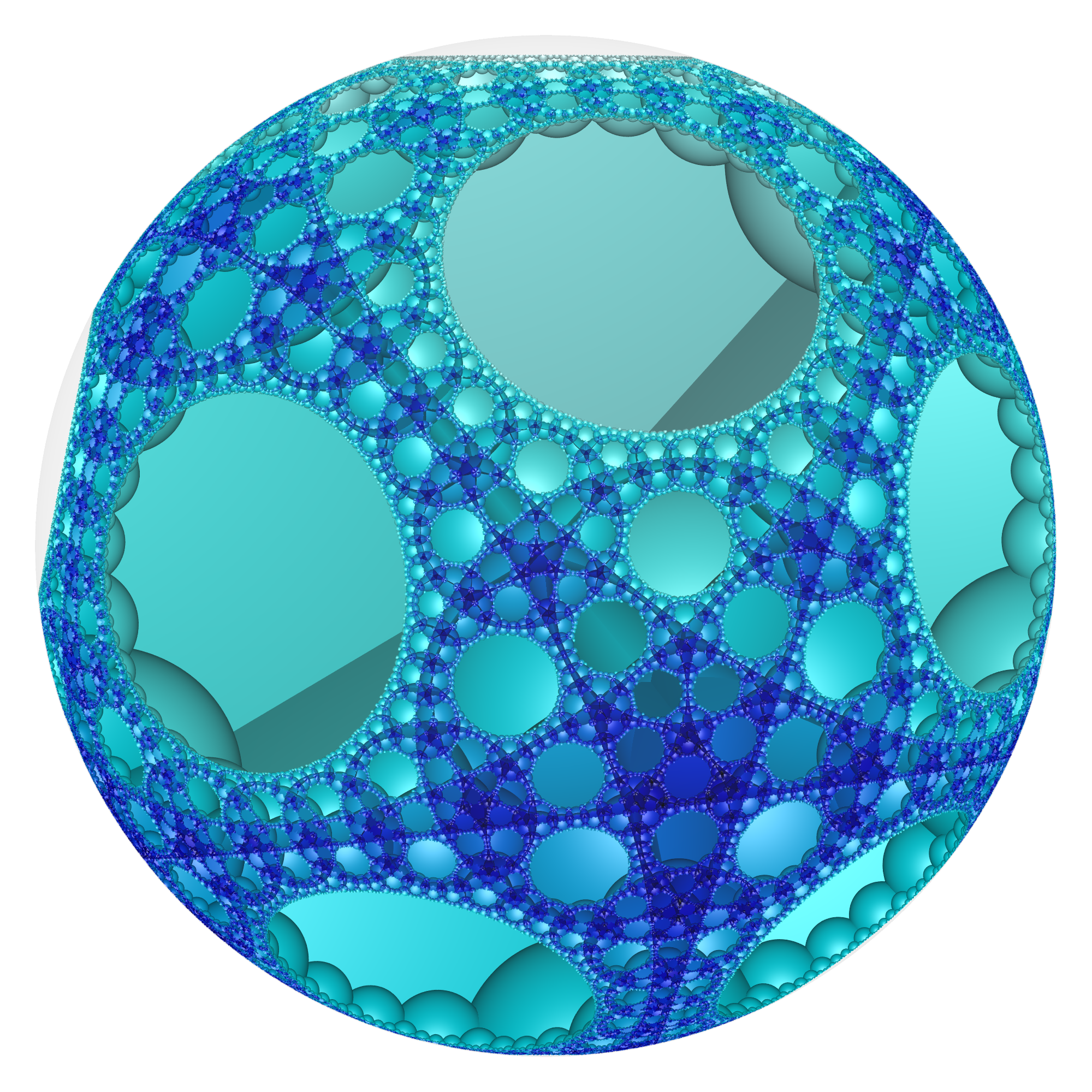
Poincaré disk model
(vertex centered)

=== Order-3-5 apeirogonal honeycomb ===
Order-3-5 apeirogonal honeycomb
Type	Regular honeycomb
Schläfli symbol	{∞,3,5}
Coxeter diagram	
Cells	{∞,3}
Faces	Apeirogon {∞}
Vertex figure	icosahedron {3,5}
Dual	{5,3,∞}
Coxeter group	[∞,3,5]
Properties	Regular

In the geometry of hyperbolic 3-space, the order-3-5 apeirogonal honeycomb a regular space-filling tessellation (or honeycomb). Each infinite cell consists of an order-3 apeirogonal tiling whose vertices lie on a 2-hypercycle, each of which has a limiting circle on the ideal sphere.

The Schläfli symbol of the order-3-5 apeirogonal honeycomb is {∞,3,5}, with five order-3 apeirogonal tilings meeting at each edge. The vertex figure of this honeycomb is an icosahedron, {3,5}.

Poincaré disk model (vertex centered)	Ideal surface

== See also ==
- Convex uniform honeycombs in hyperbolic space
- List of regular polytopes
