= Icosahedral honeycomb =

Regular tiling of hyperbolic 3-space

Icosahedral honeycomb
viewpoint cell centered
Type	Hyperbolic regular honeycomb Uniform hyperbolic honeycomb
Schläfli symbol	{3,5,3}
Coxeter diagram	
Cells	{5,3} (regular icosahedron)
Faces	{3} (triangle)
Edge figure	{3} (triangle)
Vertex figure	dodecahedron
Dual	Self-dual
Coxeter group	J̅_{3}, [3,5,3]
Properties	Regular

In geometry, the icosahedral honeycomb is one of four compact, regular, space-filling tessellations (or honeycombs) in hyperbolic 3-space. With Schläfli symbol {3,5,3}, there are three icosahedra around each edge, and 12 icosahedra around each vertex, in a regular dodecahedral vertex figure. It is analogous to the 24-cell and the 5-cell.

A geometric honeycomb is a space-filling of polyhedral or higher-dimensional cells, so that there are no gaps. It is an example of the more general mathematical tiling or tessellation in any number of dimensions.

Honeycombs are usually constructed in ordinary Euclidean ("flat") space, like the convex uniform honeycombs. They may also be constructed in non-Euclidean spaces, such as hyperbolic uniform honeycombs. Any finite uniform polytope can be projected to its circumsphere to form a uniform honeycomb in spherical space.

== Description ==
The dihedral angle of a regular icosahedron is around 138.2°, so it is impossible to fit three icosahedra around an edge in Euclidean 3-space. However, in hyperbolic space, properly scaled icosahedra can have dihedral angles of exactly 120 degrees, so three of those can fit around an edge.

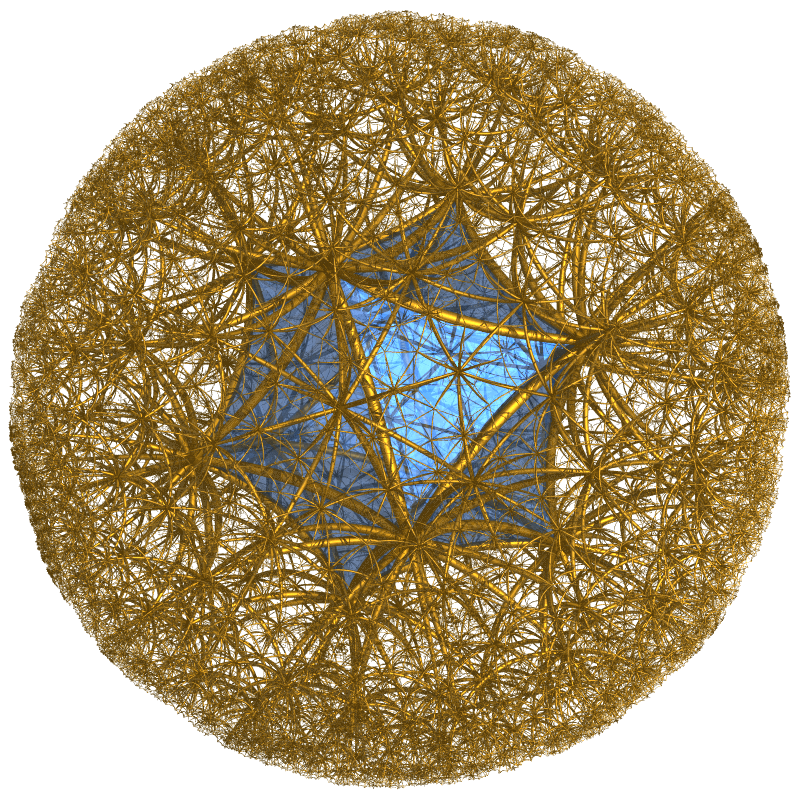
Honeycomb seen in perspective outside Poincare's model disk

== Related regular honeycombs ==
There are four regular compact honeycombs in 3D hyperbolic space:

Four regular compact honeycombs in H^{3}
{5,3,4}	{4,3,5}	{3,5,3}	{5,3,5}

== Related regular polytopes and honeycombs ==
It is a member of a sequence of regular polychora and honeycombs {3,p,3} with deltrahedral cells:

{3,p,3} polytopes
Space	S^{3}		H^{3}				
Form	Finite		Compact	Paracompact	Noncompact		
{3,p,3}	{3,3,3}	{3,4,3}	{3,5,3}	{3,6,3}	{3,7,3}	{3,8,3}	... {3,∞,3}
Image							
Cells	{3,3}	{3,4}	{3,5}	{3,6}	{3,7}	{3,8}	{3,∞}
Vertex figure	{3,3}	{4,3}	{5,3}	{6,3}	{7,3}	{8,3}	{∞,3}

It is also a member of a sequence of regular polychora and honeycombs {p,5,p}, with vertex figures composed of pentagons:

{p,5,p} regular honeycombs
Space	H^{3}						
Form	Compact	Noncompact					
Name	{3,5,3}	{4,5,4}	{5,5,5}	{6,5,6}	{7,5,7}	{8,5,8}	...{∞,5,∞}
Image							
Cells {p,5}	{3,5}	{4,5}	{5,5}	{6,5}	{7,5}	{8,5}	{∞,5}
Vertex figure {5,p}	{5,3}	{5,4}	{5,5}	{5,6}	{5,7}	{5,8}	{5,∞}

== Uniform honeycombs ==
There are nine uniform honeycombs in the [3,5,3] Coxeter group family, including this regular form as well as the bitruncated form, t_{1,2}{3,5,3},, also called truncated dodecahedral honeycomb, each of whose cells are truncated dodecahedra.

[3,5,3] family honeycombs
{3,5,3}	t_{1}{3,5,3}	t_{0,1}{3,5,3}	t_{0,2}{3,5,3}	t_{0,3}{3,5,3}
	t_{1,2}{3,5,3}	t_{0,1,2}{3,5,3}	t_{0,1,3}{3,5,3}	t_{0,1,2,3}{3,5,3}

=== Rectified icosahedral honeycomb ===
Rectified icosahedral honeycomb
Type	Uniform honeycombs in hyperbolic space
Schläfli symbol	r{3,5,3} or t_{1}{3,5,3}
Coxeter diagram	
Cells	r{3,5} {5,3}
Faces	triangle {3} pentagon {5}
Vertex figure	triangular prism
Coxeter group	$\overline{J}_3$, [3,5,3]
Properties	Vertex-transitive, edge-transitive

The rectified icosahedral honeycomb, t_{1}{3,5,3},, has alternating dodecahedron and icosidodecahedron cells, with a triangular prism vertex figure:

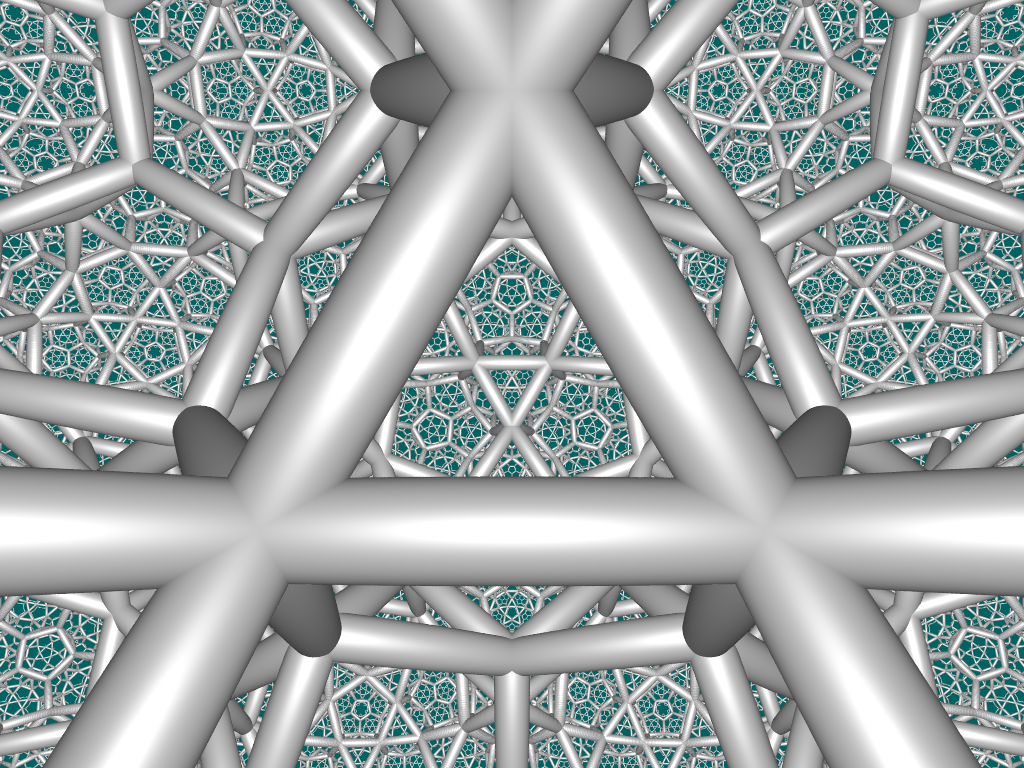
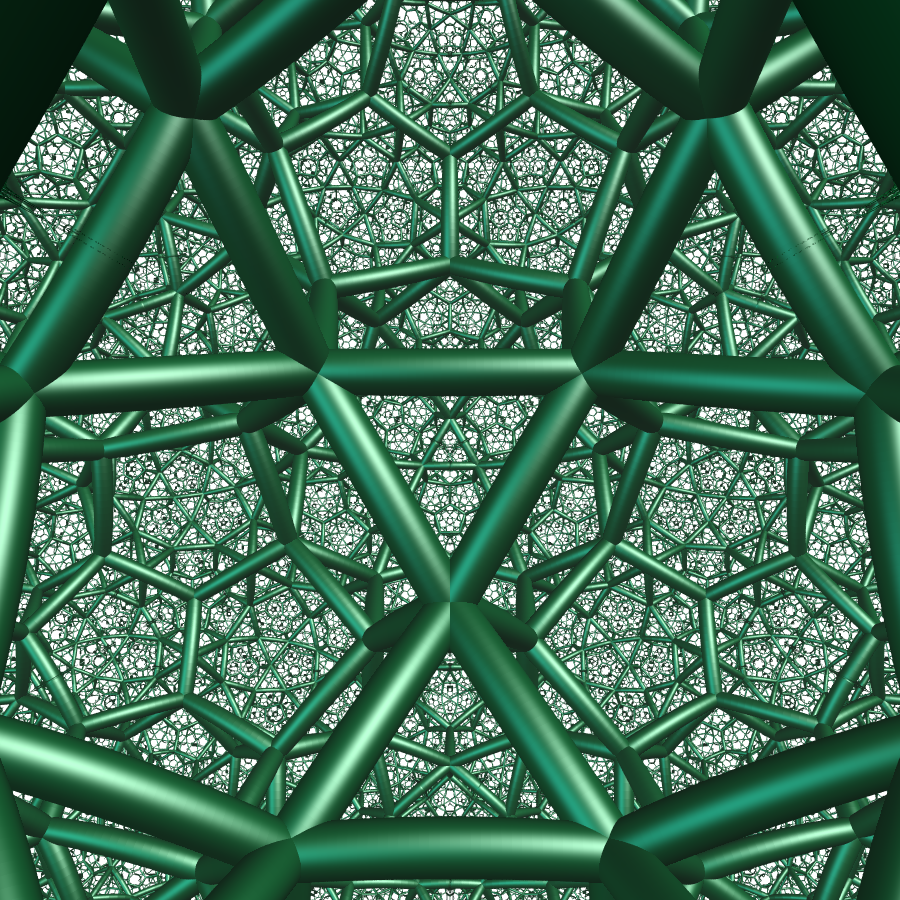
Perspective projections from center of Poincaré disk model

==== Related honeycomb ====
There are four rectified compact regular honeycombs:

Four rectified regular compact honeycombs in H^{3}
Image				
Symbols	r{5,3,4}	r{4,3,5}	r{3,5,3}	r{5,3,5}
Vertex figure				

=== Truncated icosahedral honeycomb ===
Truncated icosahedral honeycomb
Type	Uniform honeycombs in hyperbolic space
Schläfli symbol	t{3,5,3} or t_{0,1}{3,5,3}
Coxeter diagram	
Cells	t{3,5} {5,3}
Faces	pentagon {5} hexagon {6}
Vertex figure	triangular pyramid
Coxeter group	$\overline{J}_3$, [3,5,3]
Properties	Vertex-transitive

The truncated icosahedral honeycomb, t_{0,1}{3,5,3},, has alternating dodecahedron and truncated icosahedron cells, with a triangular pyramid vertex figure.

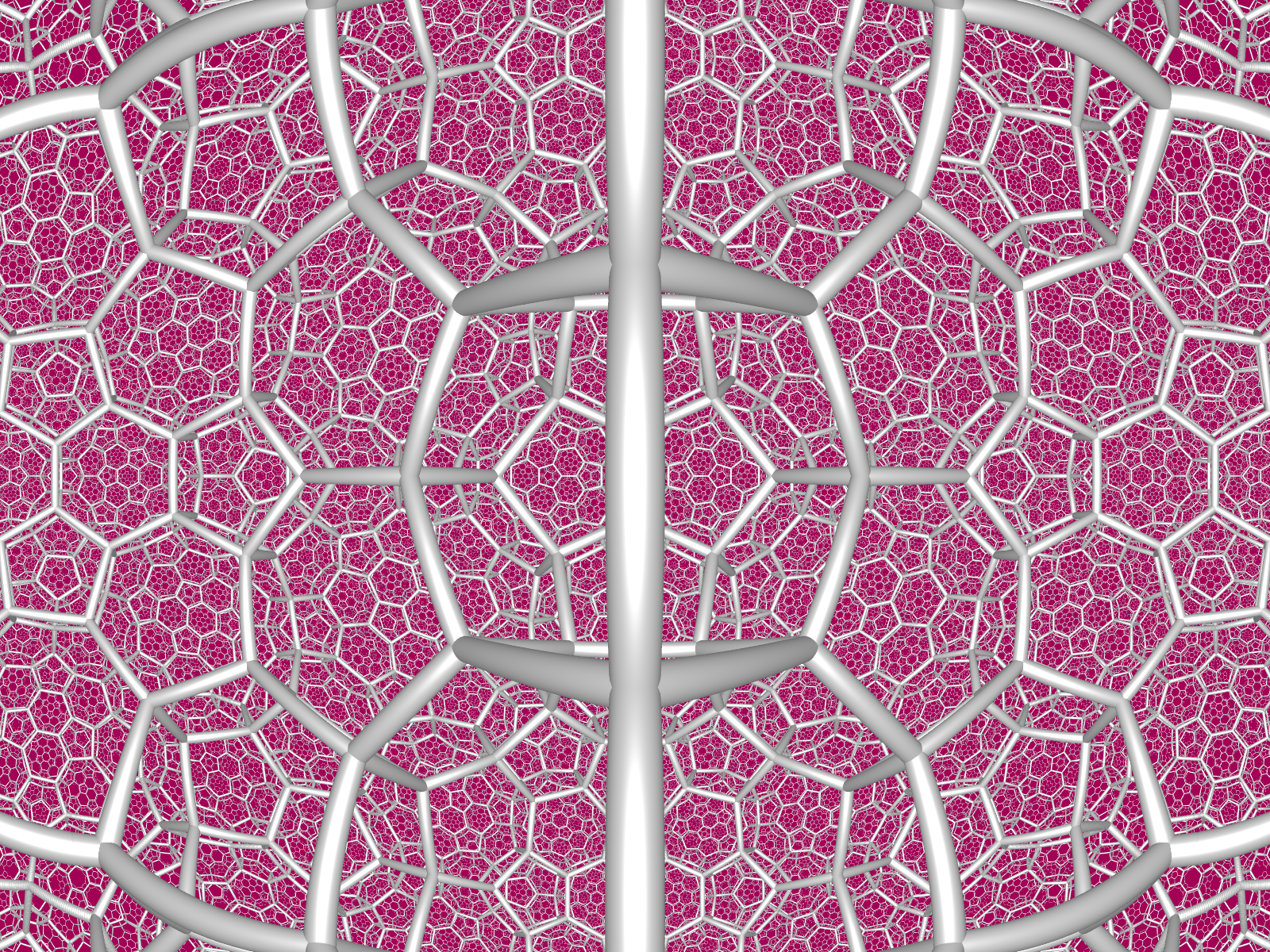

==== Related honeycombs ====
Four truncated regular compact honeycombs in H^{3}
Image				
Symbols	t{5,3,4}	t{4,3,5}	t{3,5,3}	t{5,3,5}
Vertex figure				

=== Bitruncated icosahedral honeycomb ===
Bitruncated icosahedral honeycomb
Type	Uniform honeycombs in hyperbolic space
Schläfli symbol	2t{3,5,3} or t_{1,2}{3,5,3}
Coxeter diagram	
Cells	t{5,3}
Faces	triangle {3} decagon {10}
Vertex figure	tetragonal disphenoid
Coxeter group	$2\times\overline{J}_3$, [[3,5,3]]
Properties	Vertex-transitive, edge-transitive, cell-transitive

The bitruncated icosahedral honeycomb, t_{1,2}{3,5,3},, has truncated dodecahedron cells with a tetragonal disphenoid vertex figure.

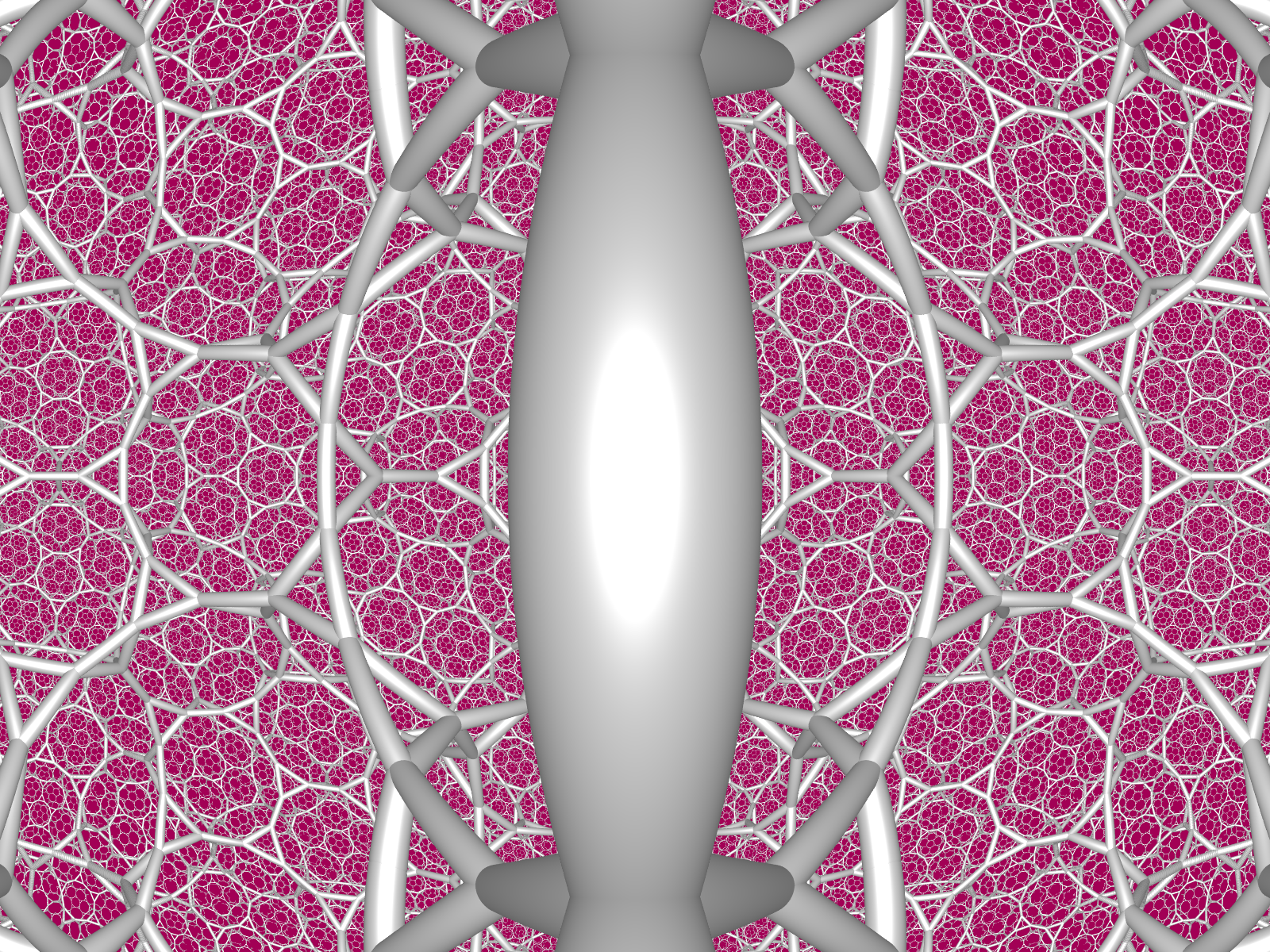

==== Related honeycombs ====
Three bitruncated compact honeycombs in H^{3}
Image			
Symbols	2t{4,3,5}	2t{3,5,3}	2t{5,3,5}
Vertex figure			

=== Cantellated icosahedral honeycomb ===
Cantellated icosahedral honeycomb
Type	Uniform honeycombs in hyperbolic space
Schläfli symbol	rr{3,5,3} or t_{0,2}{3,5,3}
Coxeter diagram	
Cells	rr{3,5} r{5,3} {}x{3}
Faces	triangle {3} square {4} pentagon {5}
Vertex figure	wedge
Coxeter group	$\overline{J}_3$, [3,5,3]
Properties	Vertex-transitive

The cantellated icosahedral honeycomb, t_{0,2}{3,5,3},, has rhombicosidodecahedron, icosidodecahedron, and triangular prism cells, with a wedge vertex figure.

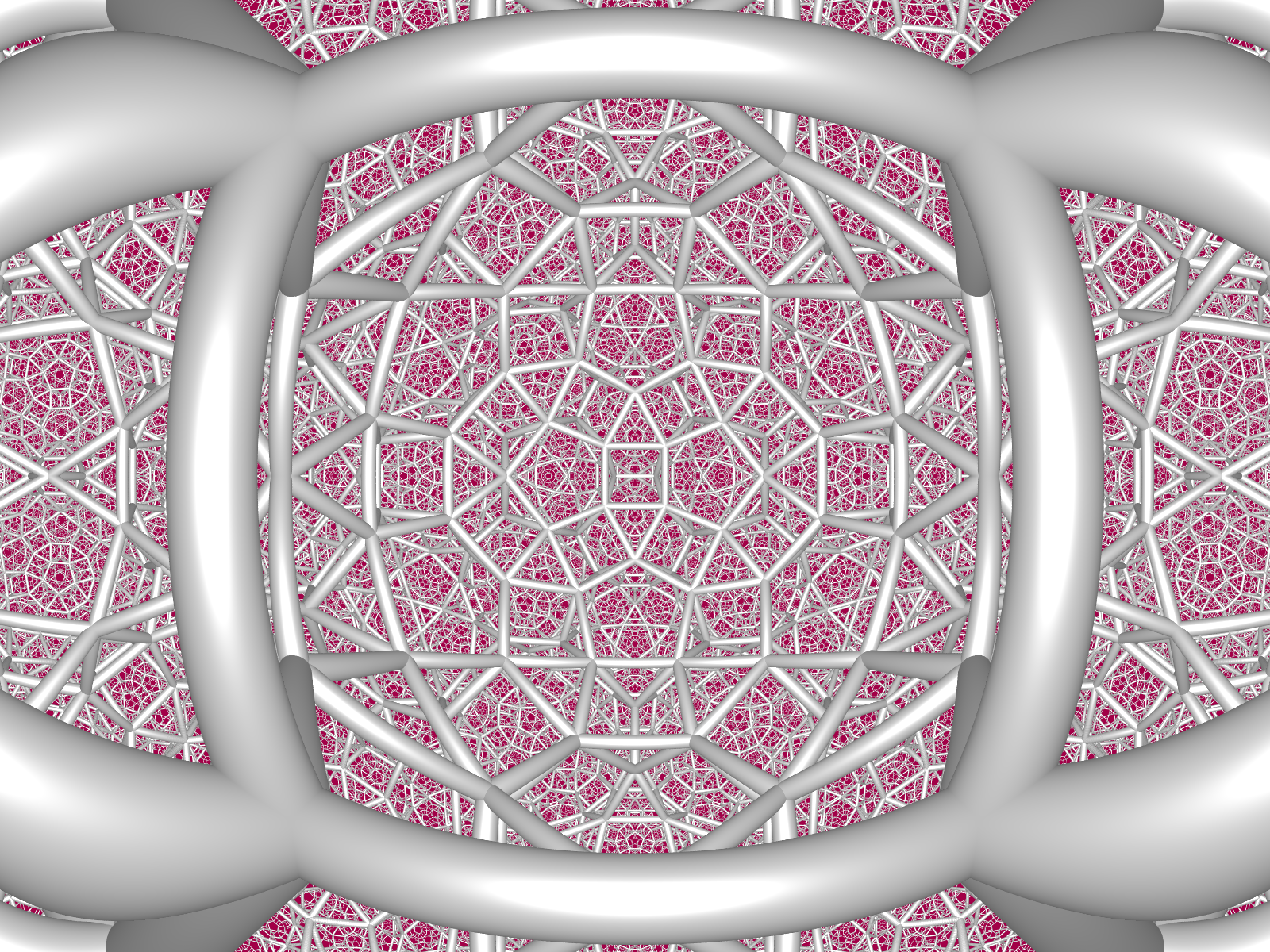

==== Related honeycombs ====
Four cantellated regular compact honeycombs in H^{3}

Image				
Symbols	rr{5,3,4}	rr{4,3,5}	rr{3,5,3}	rr{5,3,5}
Vertex figure				

=== Cantitruncated icosahedral honeycomb ===
Cantitruncated icosahedral honeycomb
Type	Uniform honeycombs in hyperbolic space
Schläfli symbol	tr{3,5,3} or t_{0,1,2}{3,5,3}
Coxeter diagram	
Cells	tr{3,5} t{5,3} {}x{3}
Faces	triangle {3} square {4} hexagon {6} decagon {10}
Vertex figure	mirrored sphenoid
Coxeter group	$\overline{J}_3$, [3,5,3]
Properties	Vertex-transitive

The cantitruncated icosahedral honeycomb, t_{0,1,2}{3,5,3},, has truncated icosidodecahedron, truncated dodecahedron, and triangular prism cells, with a mirrored sphenoid vertex figure.

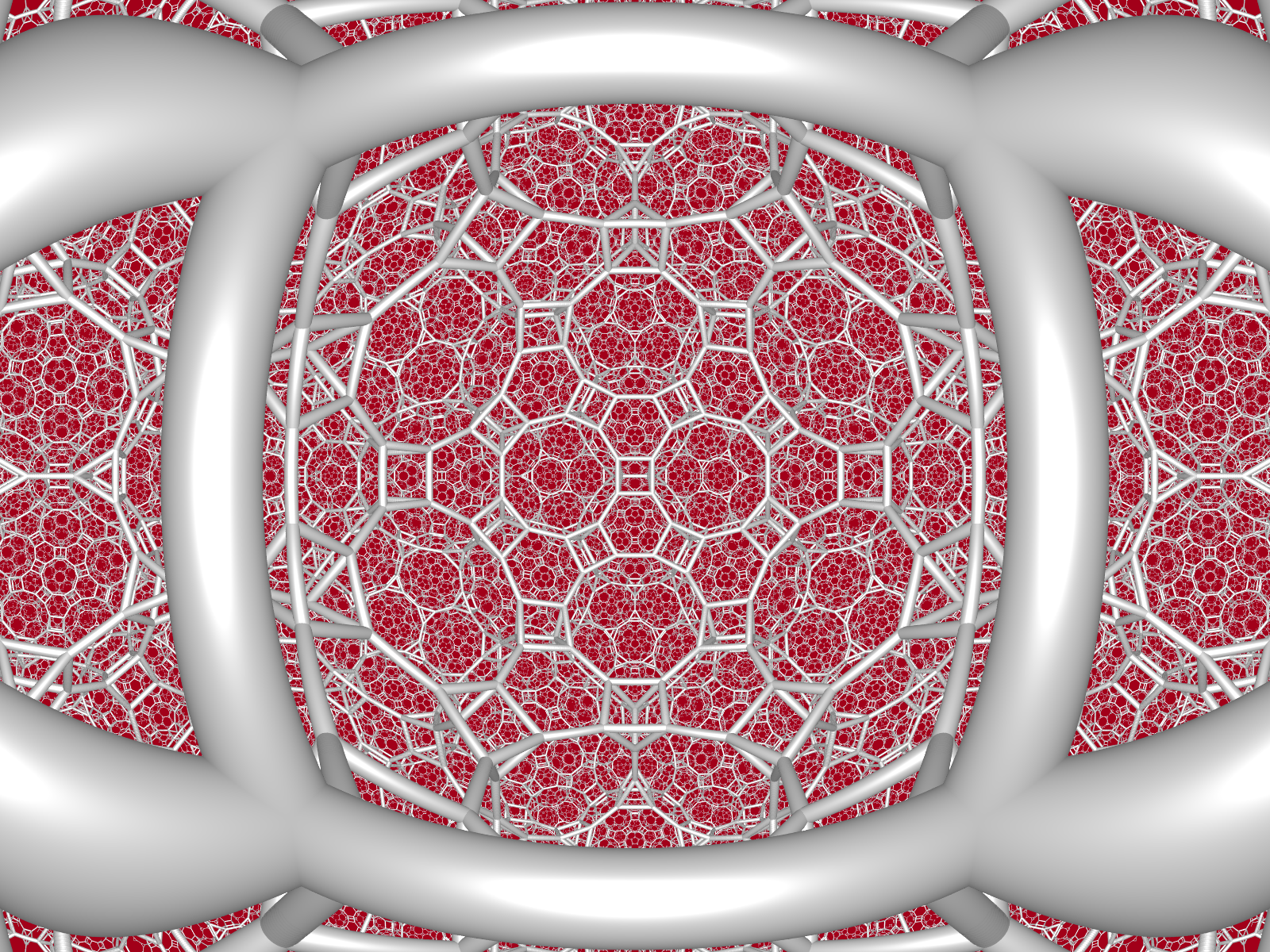

==== Related honeycombs ====
Four cantitruncated regular compact honeycombs in H^{3}
Image				
Symbols	tr{5,3,4}	tr{4,3,5}	tr{3,5,3}	tr{5,3,5}
Vertex figure				

=== Runcinated icosahedral honeycomb ===
Runcinated icosahedral honeycomb
Type	Uniform honeycombs in hyperbolic space
Schläfli symbol	t_{0,3}{3,5,3}
Coxeter diagram	
Cells	{3,5} {}×{3}
Faces	triangle {3} square {4}
Vertex figure	pentagonal antiprism
Coxeter group	$2\times\overline{J}_3$, [[3,5,3]]
Properties	Vertex-transitive, edge-transitive

The runcinated icosahedral honeycomb, t_{0,3}{3,5,3},, has icosahedron and triangular prism cells, with a pentagonal antiprism vertex figure.

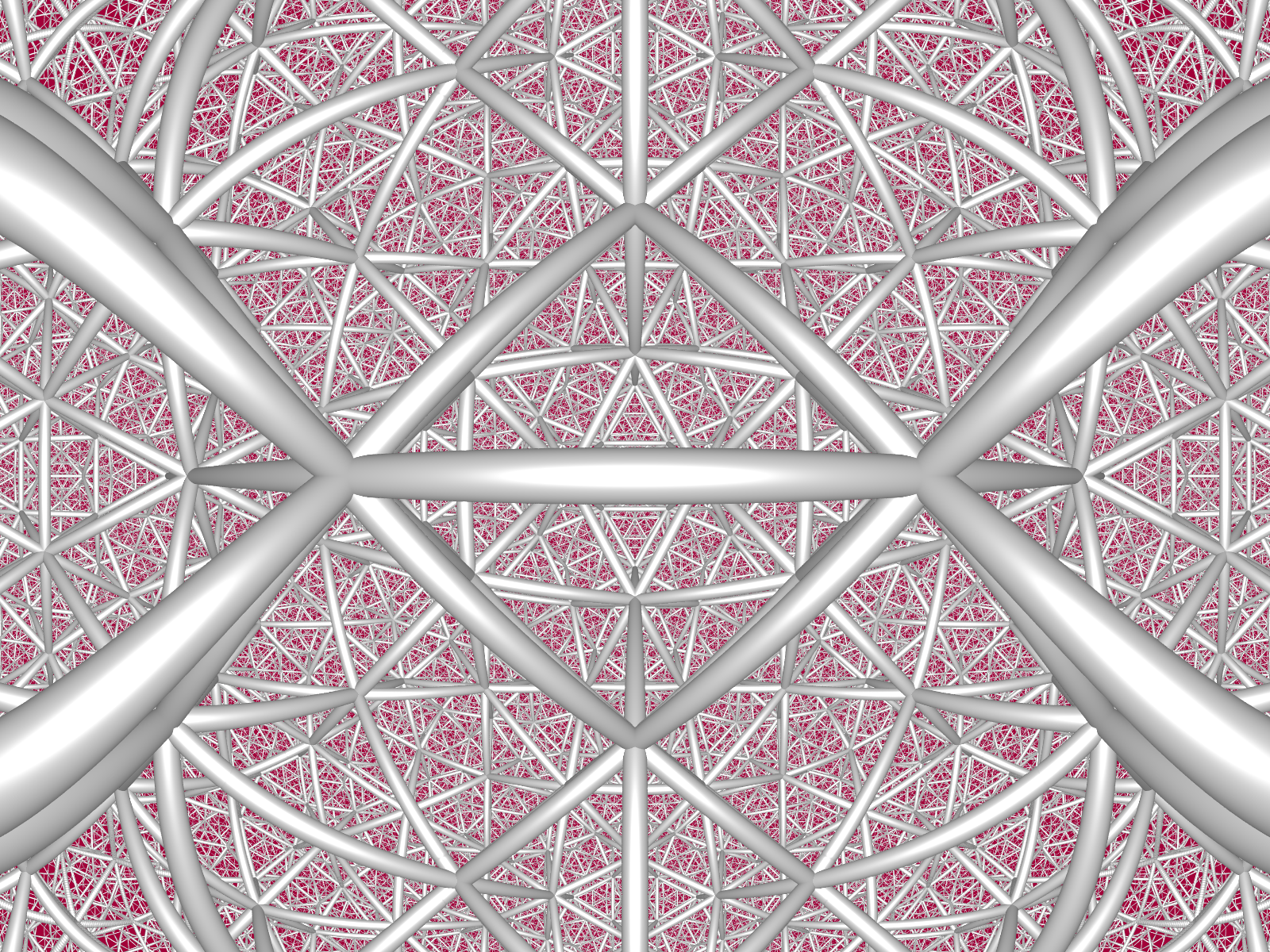

Viewed from center of triangular prism

==== Related honeycombs ====
Three runcinated regular compact honeycombs in H^{3}
Image			
Symbols	t_{0,3}{4,3,5}	t_{0,3}{3,5,3}	t_{0,3}{5,3,5}
Vertex figure			

=== Runcitruncated icosahedral honeycomb ===
Runcitruncated icosahedral honeycomb
Type	Uniform honeycombs in hyperbolic space
Schläfli symbol	t_{0,1,3}{3,5,3}
Coxeter diagram	
Cells	t{3,5} rr{3,5} {}×{3} {}×{6}
Faces	triangle {3} square {4} pentagon {5} hexagon {6}
Vertex figure	isosceles-trapezoidal pyramid
Coxeter group	$\overline{J}_3$, [3,5,3]
Properties	Vertex-transitive

The runcitruncated icosahedral honeycomb, t_{0,1,3}{3,5,3},, has truncated icosahedron, rhombicosidodecahedron, hexagonal prism, and triangular prism cells, with an isosceles-trapezoidal pyramid vertex figure.

The runcicantellated icosahedral honeycomb is equivalent to the runcitruncated icosahedral honeycomb.

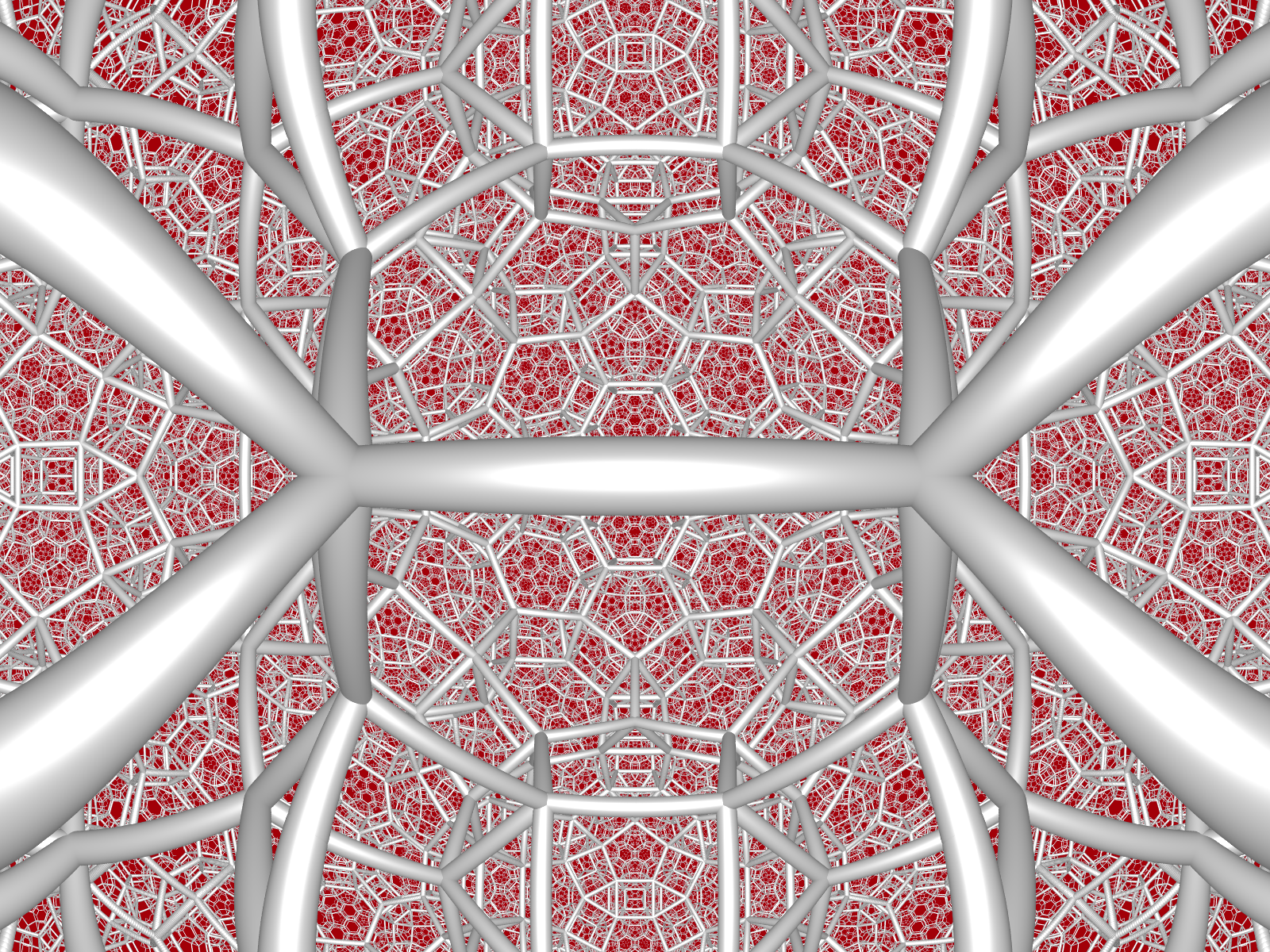

Viewed from center of triangular prism

==== Related honeycombs ====
Four runcitruncated regular compact honeycombs in H^{3}

Image				
Symbols	t_{0,1,3}{5,3,4}	t_{0,1,3}{4,3,5}	t_{0,1,3}{3,5,3}	t_{0,1,3}{5,3,5}
Vertex figure				

=== Omnitruncated icosahedral honeycomb ===
Omnitruncated icosahedral honeycomb
Type	Uniform honeycombs in hyperbolic space
Schläfli symbol	t_{0,1,2,3}{3,5,3}
Coxeter diagram	
Cells	tr{3,5} {}×{6}
Faces	square {4} hexagon {6} dodecagon {10}
Vertex figure	phyllic disphenoid
Coxeter group	$2\times\overline{J}_3$, [[3,5,3]]
Properties	Vertex-transitive

The omnitruncated icosahedral honeycomb, t_{0,1,2,3}{3,5,3},, has truncated icosidodecahedron and hexagonal prism cells, with a phyllic disphenoid vertex figure.

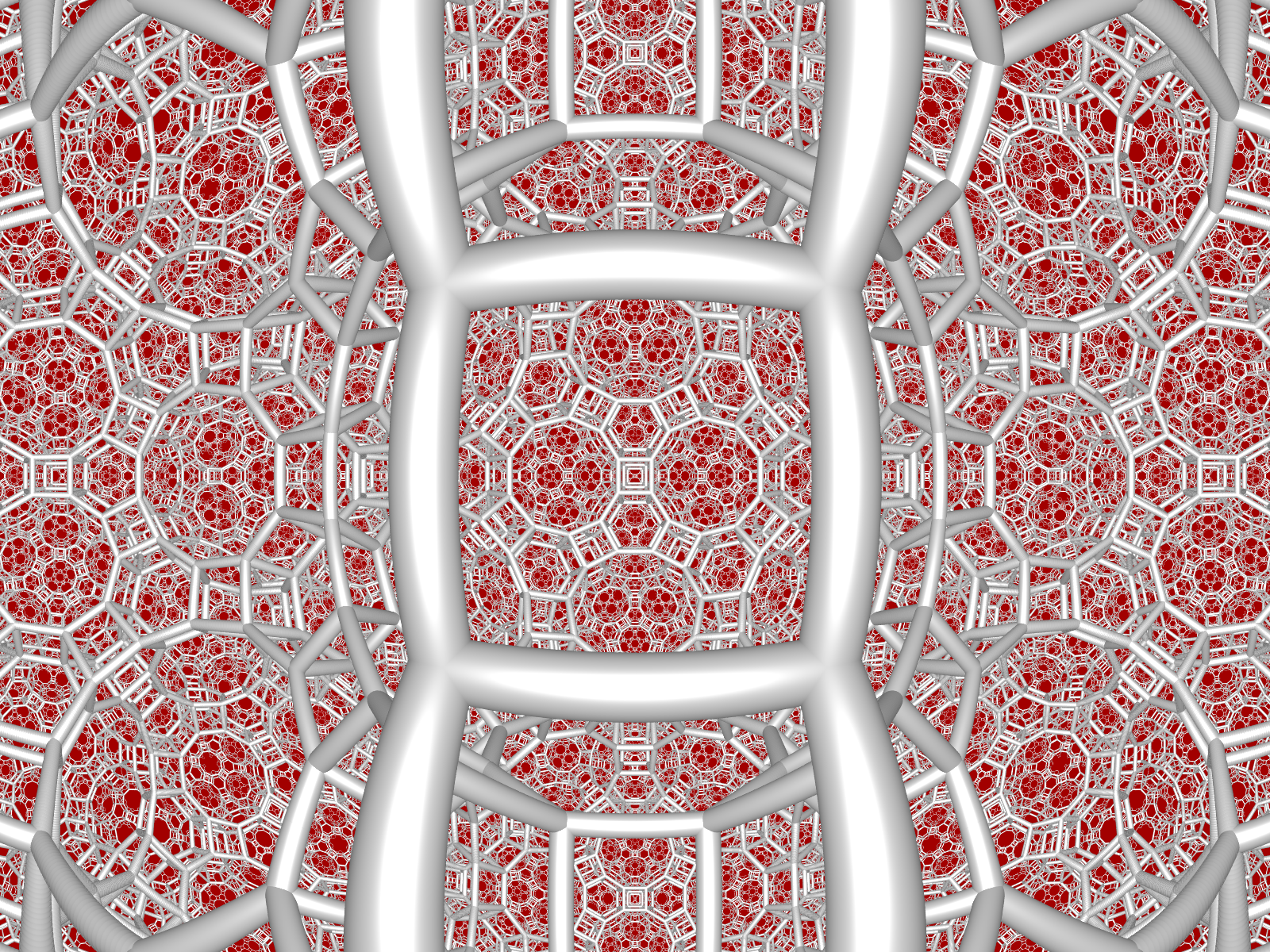

Centered on hexagonal prism

==== Related honeycombs ====
Three omnitruncated regular compact honeycombs in H^{3}

Image			
Symbols	t_{0,1,2,3}{4,3,5}	t_{0,1,2,3}{3,5,3}	t_{0,1,2,3}{5,3,5}
Vertex figure			

=== Omnisnub icosahedral honeycomb ===
Omnisnub icosahedral honeycomb
Type	Uniform honeycombs in hyperbolic space
Schläfli symbol	h(t_{0,1,2,3}{3,5,3})
Coxeter diagram	
Cells	sr{3,5} s{2,3} irr. {3,3}
Faces	triangle {3} pentagon {5}
Vertex figure	
Coxeter group	[[3,5,3]]^{+}
Properties	Vertex-transitive

The omnisnub icosahedral honeycomb, h(t_{0,1,2,3}{3,5,3}),, has snub dodecahedron, octahedron, and tetrahedron cells, with an irregular vertex figure. It is vertex-transitive, but cannot be made with uniform cells.

=== Partially diminished icosahedral honeycomb ===
Partially diminished icosahedral honeycomb Parabidiminished icosahedral honeycomb
Type	Uniform honeycombs
Schläfli symbol	pd{3,5,3}
Coxeter diagram	-
Cells	{5,3} s{2,5}
Faces	triangle {3} pentagon {5}
Vertex figure	tetrahedrally diminished dodecahedron
Coxeter group	^{1}/_{5}[3,5,3]^{+}
Properties	Vertex-transitive

The partially diminished icosahedral honeycomb or parabidiminished icosahedral honeycomb, pd{3,5,3}, is a non-Wythoffian uniform honeycomb with dodecahedron and pentagonal antiprism cells, with a tetrahedrally diminished dodecahedron vertex figure. The icosahedral cells of the {3,5,3} are diminished at opposite vertices (parabidiminished), leaving a pentagonal antiprism (parabidiminished icosahedron) core, and creating new dodecahedron cells above and below.

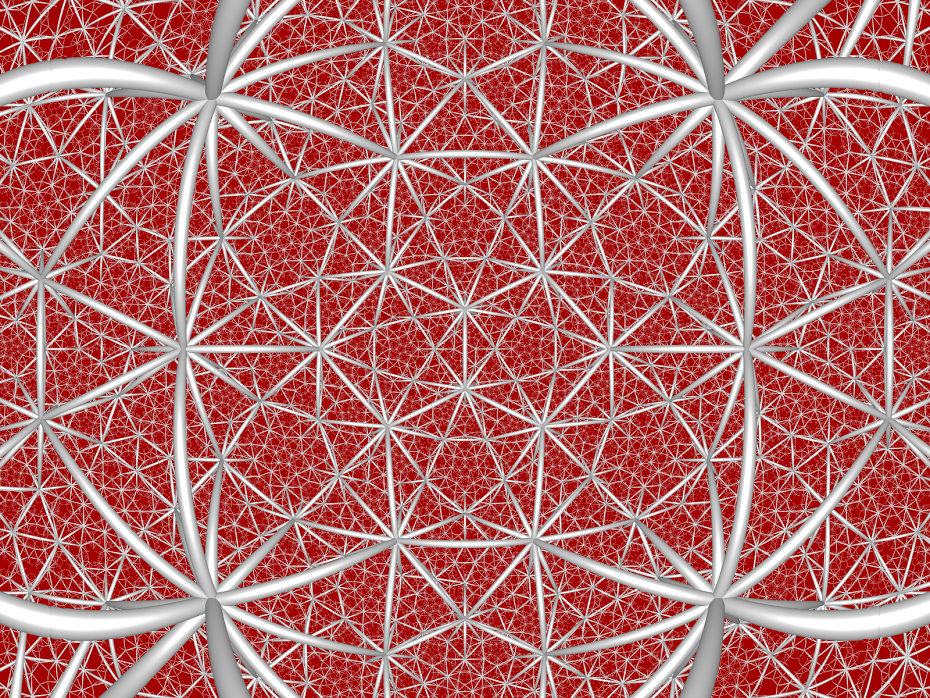

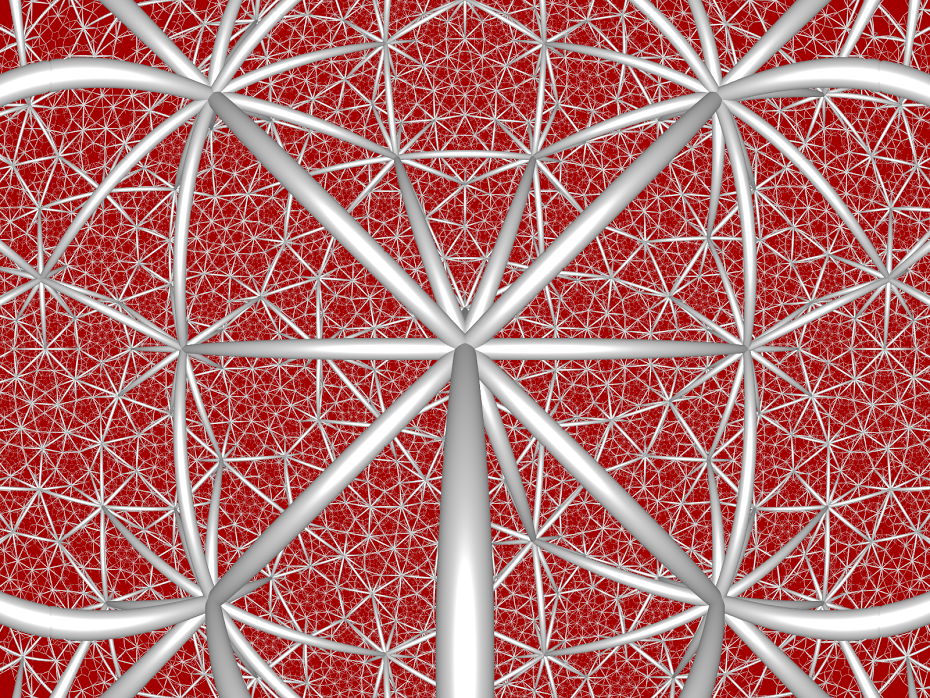

== See also ==
- Convex uniform honeycombs in hyperbolic space
- Regular tessellations of hyperbolic 3-space
- Seifert–Weber space
- 11-cell - An abstract regular polychoron which shares the {3,5,3} Schläfli symbol.
