= Order-8-3 triangular honeycomb =

Order-8-3 triangular honeycomb
Type	Regular honeycomb
Schläfli symbols	{3,8,3}
Coxeter diagrams	
Cells	{3,8}
Faces	{3}
Edge figure	{3}
Vertex figure	{8,3}
Dual	Self-dual
Coxeter group	[3,8,3]
Properties	Regular

In the geometry of hyperbolic 3-space, the order-8-3 triangular honeycomb (or 3,8,3 honeycomb) is a regular space-filling tessellation (or honeycomb) with Schläfli symbol {3,8,3}.

== Geometry ==
It has three order-8 triangular tiling {3,8} around each edge. All vertices are ultra-ideal (existing beyond the ideal boundary) with infinitely many triangular tilings existing around each vertex in an octagonal tiling vertex figure.

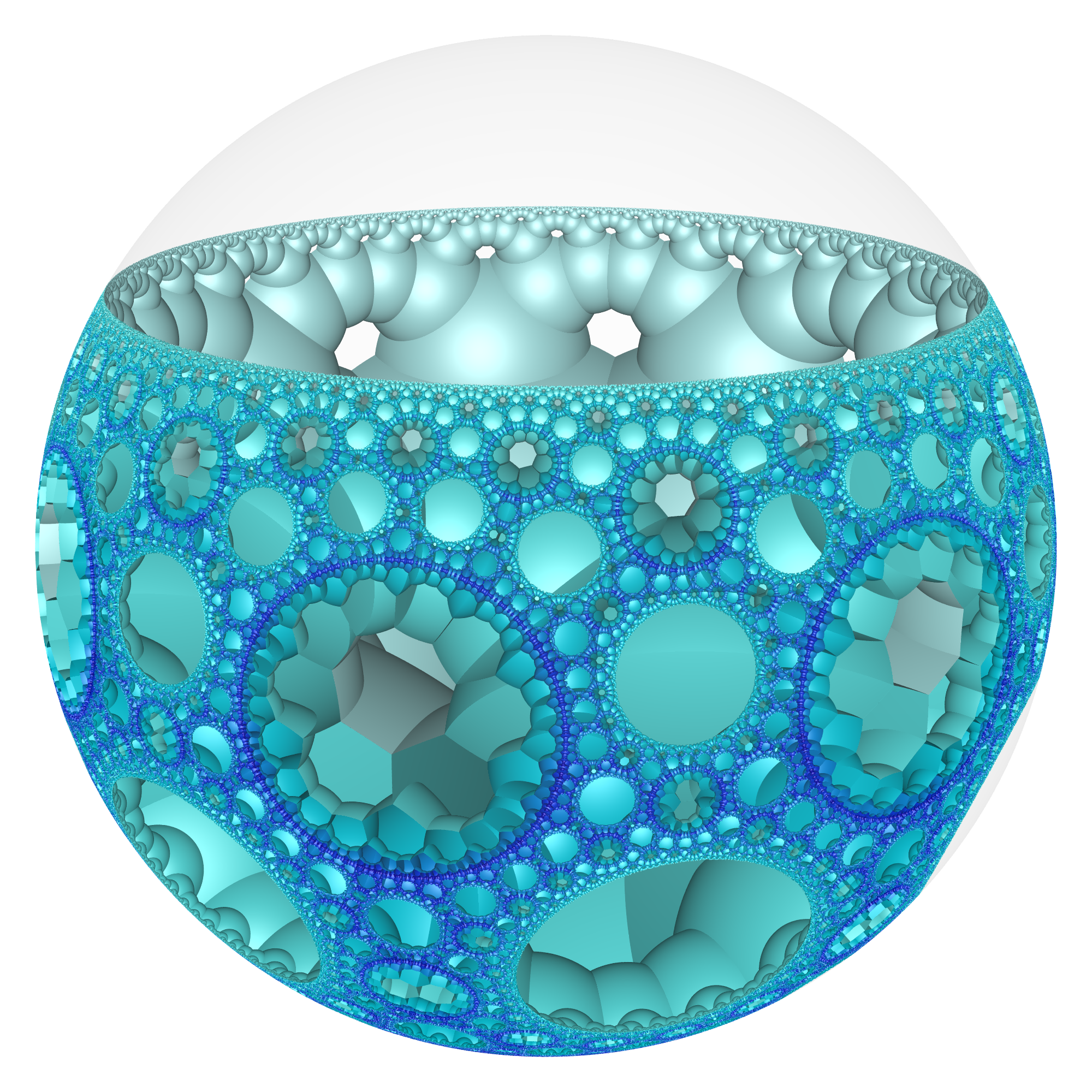
Poincaré disk model

== Related polytopes and honeycombs ==
It is a part of a sequence of regular honeycombs with order-8 triangular tiling cells: {3,8,p}.

It is a part of a sequence of regular honeycombs with octagonal tiling vertex figures: {p,8,3}.

It is a part of a sequence of self-dual regular honeycombs: {p,8,p}.

=== Order-8-4 triangular honeycomb ===
Order-8-4 triangular honeycomb
Type	Regular honeycomb
Schläfli symbols	{3,8,4}
Coxeter diagrams	=
Cells	{3,8}
Faces	{3}
Edge figure	{4}
Vertex figure	{8,4} r{8,8}
Dual	{4,8,3}
Coxeter group	[3,8,4]
Properties	Regular

In the geometry of hyperbolic 3-space, the order-8-4 triangular honeycomb (or 3,8,4 honeycomb) is a regular space-filling tessellation (or honeycomb) with Schläfli symbol {3,8,4}.

It has four order-8 triangular tilings, {3,8}, around each edge. All vertices are ultra-ideal (existing beyond the ideal boundary) with infinitely many order-8 triangular tilings existing around each vertex in an order-4 hexagonal tiling vertex arrangement.

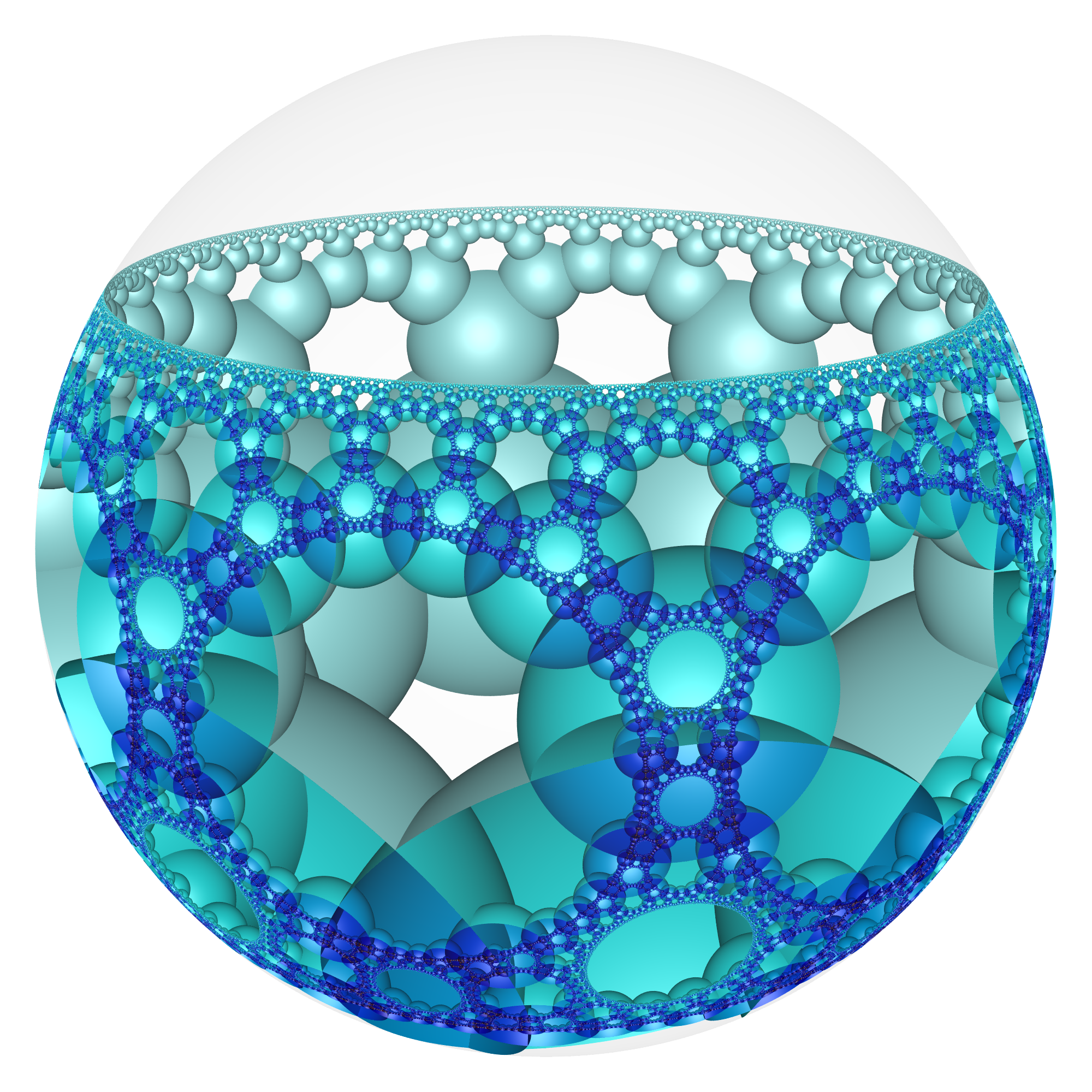
Poincaré disk model

It has a second construction as a uniform honeycomb, Schläfli symbol {3,8^{1,1}}, Coxeter diagram,, with alternating types or colors of order-8 triangular tiling cells. In Coxeter notation the half symmetry is [3,8,4,1^{+}] = [3,8^{1,1}].

=== Order-8-5 triangular honeycomb ===
Order-8-5 triangular honeycomb
Type	Regular honeycomb
Schläfli symbols	{3,8,5}
Coxeter diagrams	
Cells	{3,8}
Faces	{3}
Edge figure	{5}
Vertex figure	{8,5}
Dual	{5,8,3}
Coxeter group	[3,8,5]
Properties	Regular

In the geometry of hyperbolic 3-space, the order-8-3 triangular honeycomb (or 3,8,5 honeycomb) is a regular space-filling tessellation (or honeycomb) with Schläfli symbol {3,8,5}. It has five order-8 triangular tiling, {3,8}, around each edge. All vertices are ultra-ideal (existing beyond the ideal boundary) with infinitely many order-8 triangular tilings existing around each vertex in an order-5 octagonal tiling vertex figure.

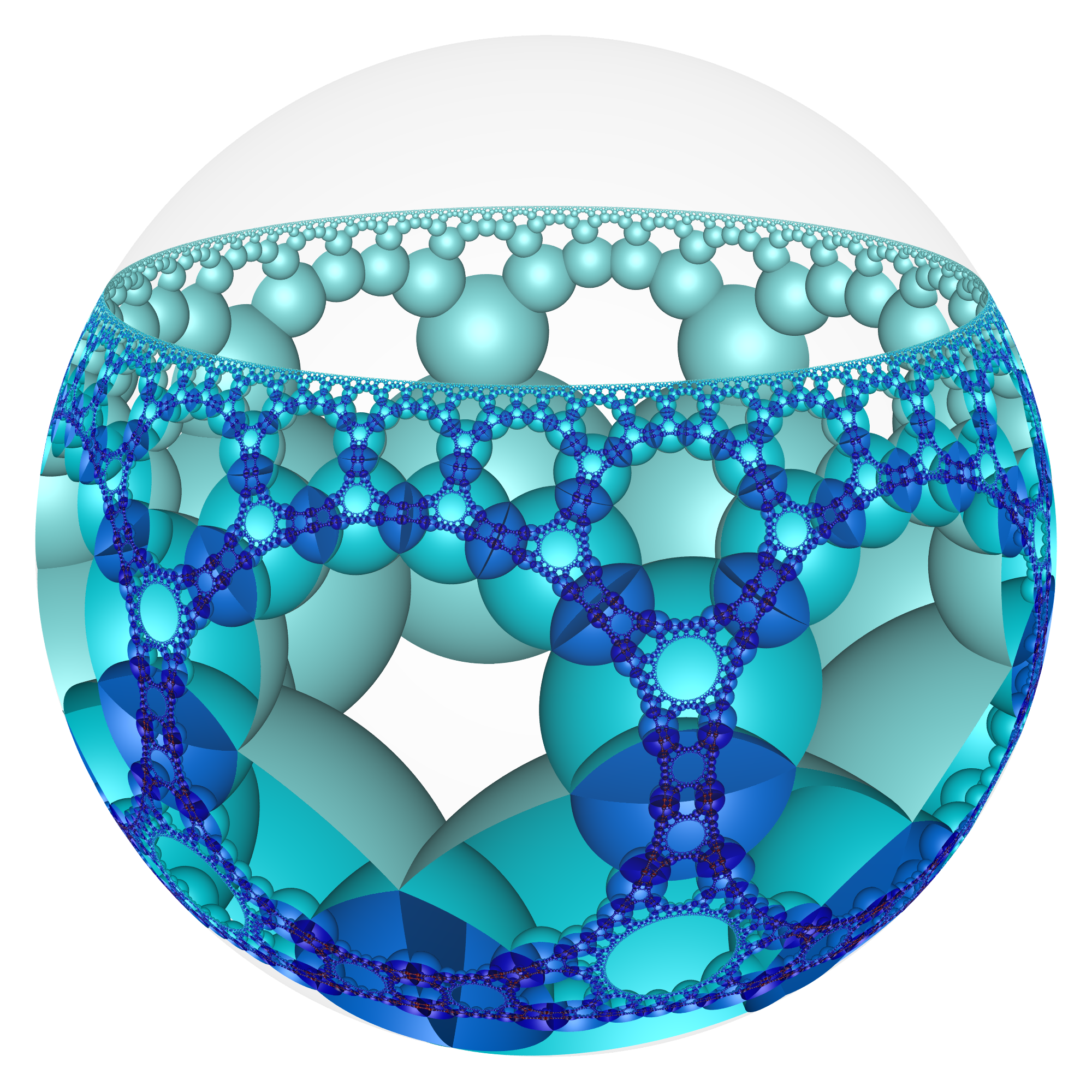
Poincaré disk model

=== Order-8-6 triangular honeycomb ===
Order-8-6 triangular honeycomb
Type	Regular honeycomb
Schläfli symbols	{3,8,6} {3,(8,3,8)}
Coxeter diagrams	=
Cells	{3,8}
Faces	{3}
Edge figure	{6}
Vertex figure	{8,6} {(8,3,8)}
Dual	{6,8,3}
Coxeter group	[3,8,6]
Properties	Regular

In the geometry of hyperbolic 3-space, the order-8-6 triangular honeycomb (or 3,8,6 honeycomb) is a regular space-filling tessellation (or honeycomb) with Schläfli symbol {3,8,6}. It has infinitely many order-8 triangular tiling, {3,8}, around each edge. All vertices are ultra-ideal (existing beyond the ideal boundary) with infinitely many order-8 triangular tilings existing around each vertex in an order-6 octagonal tiling, {8,6}, vertex figure.

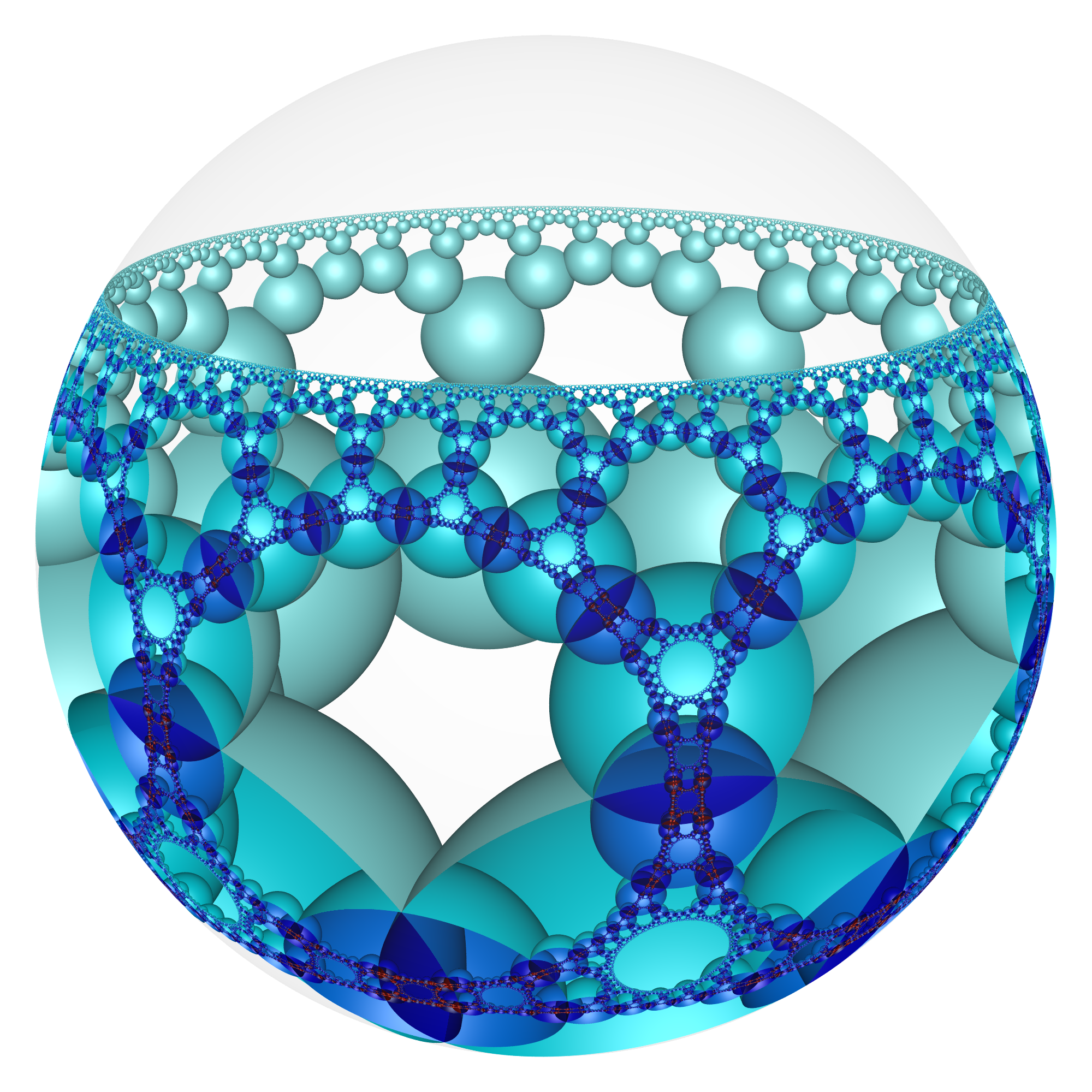
Poincaré disk model

=== Order-8-infinite triangular honeycomb ===
Order-8-infinite triangular honeycomb
Type	Regular honeycomb
Schläfli symbols	{3,8,∞} {3,(8,∞,8)}
Coxeter diagrams	=
Cells	{3,8}
Faces	{3}
Edge figure	{∞}
Vertex figure	{8,∞} {(8,∞,8)}
Dual	{∞,8,3}
Coxeter group	[∞,8,3] [3,((8,∞,8))]
Properties	Regular

In the geometry of hyperbolic 3-space, the order-8-infinite triangular honeycomb (or 3,8,∞ honeycomb) is a regular space-filling tessellation (or honeycomb) with Schläfli symbol {3,8,∞}. It has infinitely many order-8 triangular tiling, {3,8}, around each edge. All vertices are ultra-ideal (existing beyond the ideal boundary) with infinitely many order-8 triangular tilings existing around each vertex in an infinite-order octagonal tiling, {8,∞}, vertex figure.

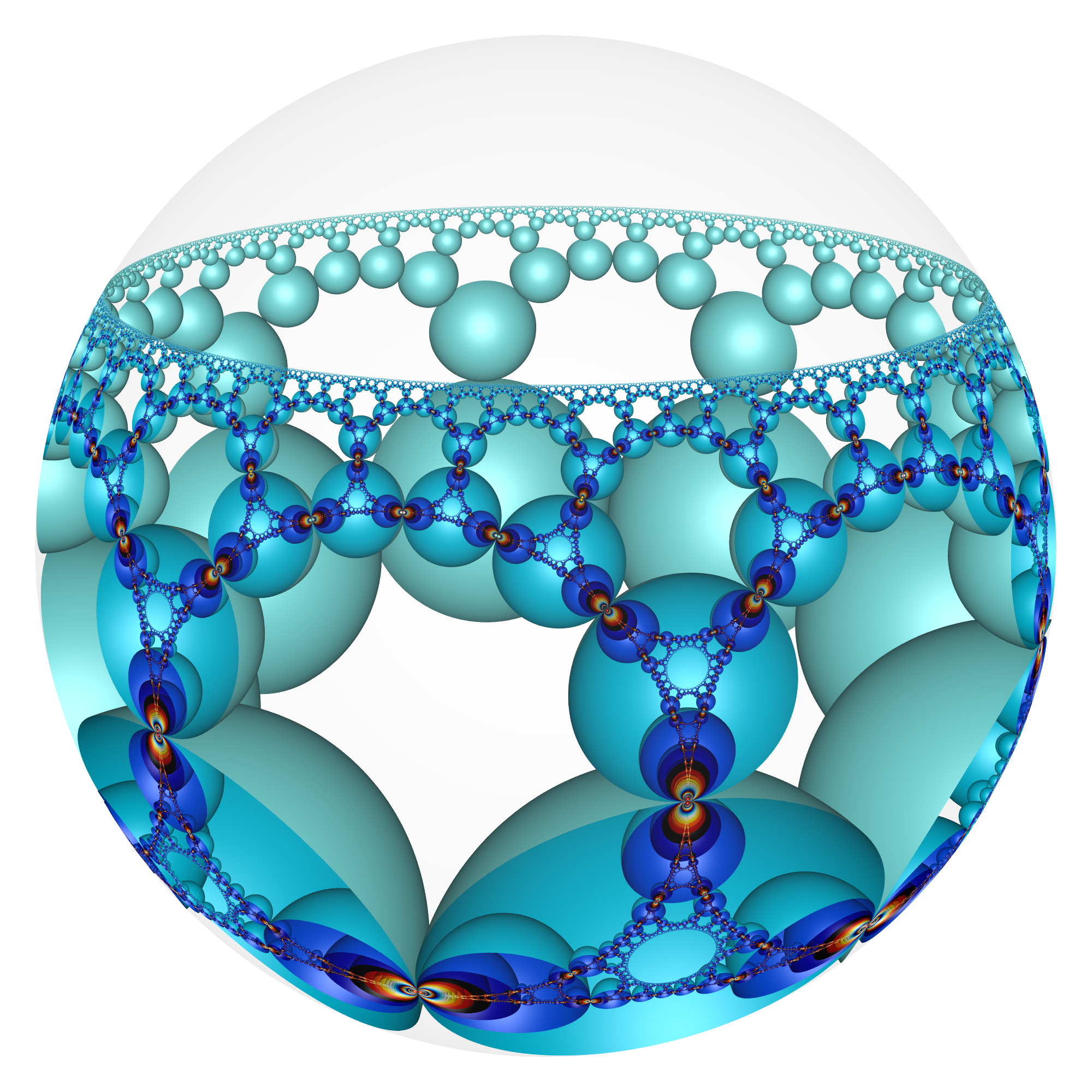
Poincaré disk model

It has a second construction as a uniform honeycomb, Schläfli symbol {3,(8,∞,8)}, Coxeter diagram, =, with alternating types or colors of order-8 triangular tiling cells. In Coxeter notation the half symmetry is [3,8,∞,1^{+}] = [3,((8,∞,8))].

=== Order-8-3 square honeycomb ===
Order-8-3 square honeycomb
Type	Regular honeycomb
Schläfli symbol	{4,8,3}
Coxeter diagram	
Cells	{4,8}
Faces	{4}
Vertex figure	{8,3}
Dual	{3,8,4}
Coxeter group	[4,8,3]
Properties	Regular

In the geometry of hyperbolic 3-space, the order-8-3 square honeycomb (or 4,8,3 honeycomb) a regular space-filling tessellation (or honeycomb). Each infinite cell consists of an octagonal tiling whose vertices lie on a 2-hypercycle, each of which has a limiting circle on the ideal sphere.

The Schläfli symbol of the order-8-3 square honeycomb is {4,8,3}, with three order-4 octagonal tilings meeting at each edge. The vertex figure of this honeycomb is an octagonal tiling, {8,3}.

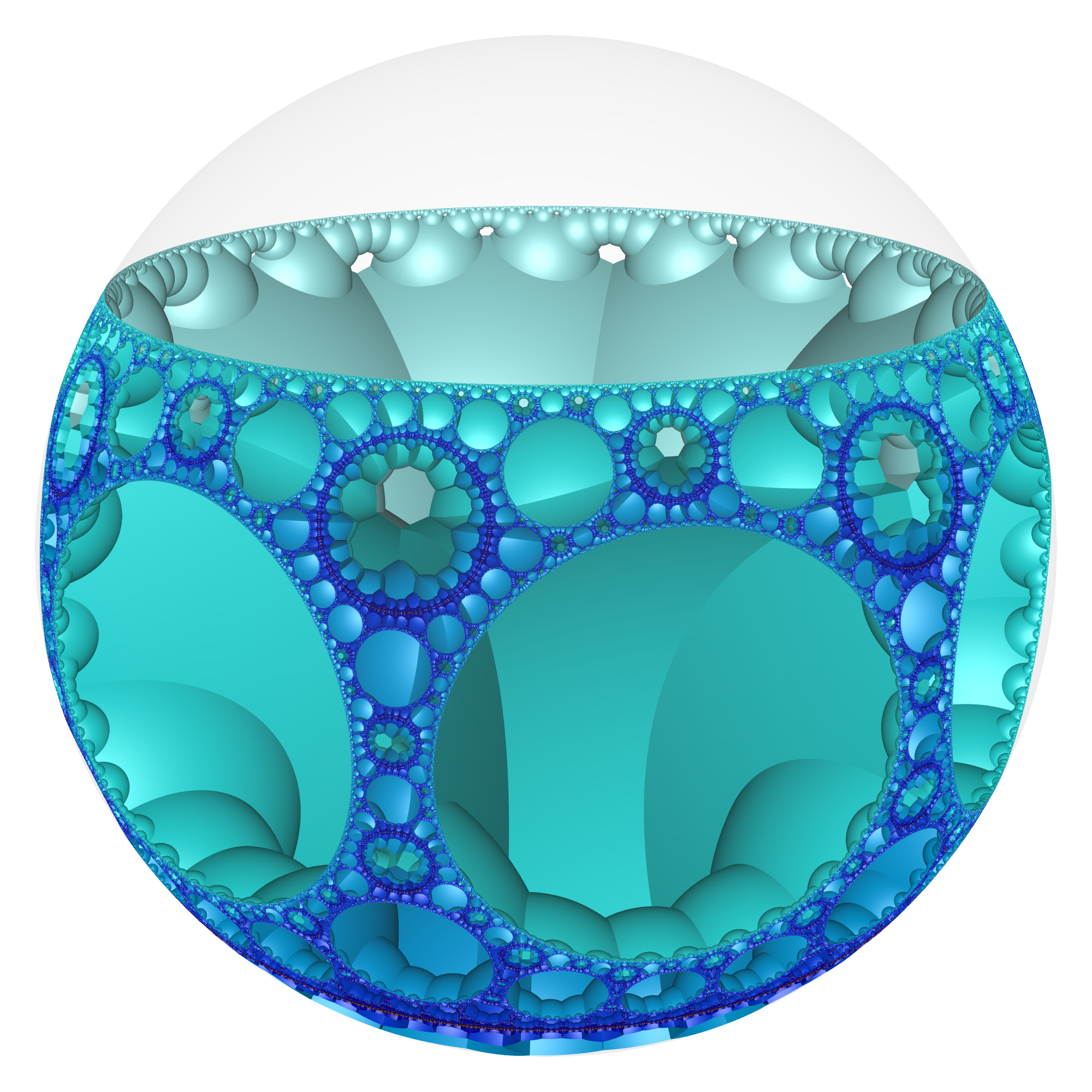
Poincaré disk model

=== Order-8-3 pentagonal honeycomb ===
Order-8-3 pentagonal honeycomb
Type	Regular honeycomb
Schläfli symbol	{5,8,3}
Coxeter diagram	
Cells	{5,8}
Faces	{5}
Vertex figure	{8,3}
Dual	{3,8,5}
Coxeter group	[5,8,3]
Properties	Regular

In the geometry of hyperbolic 3-space, the order-8-3 pentagonal honeycomb (or 5,8,3 honeycomb) a regular space-filling tessellation (or honeycomb). Each infinite cell consists of an order-8 pentagonal tiling whose vertices lie on a 2-hypercycle, each of which has a limiting circle on the ideal sphere.

The Schläfli symbol of the order-6-3 pentagonal honeycomb is {5,8,3}, with three order-8 pentagonal tilings meeting at each edge. The vertex figure of this honeycomb is an octagonal tiling, {8,3}.

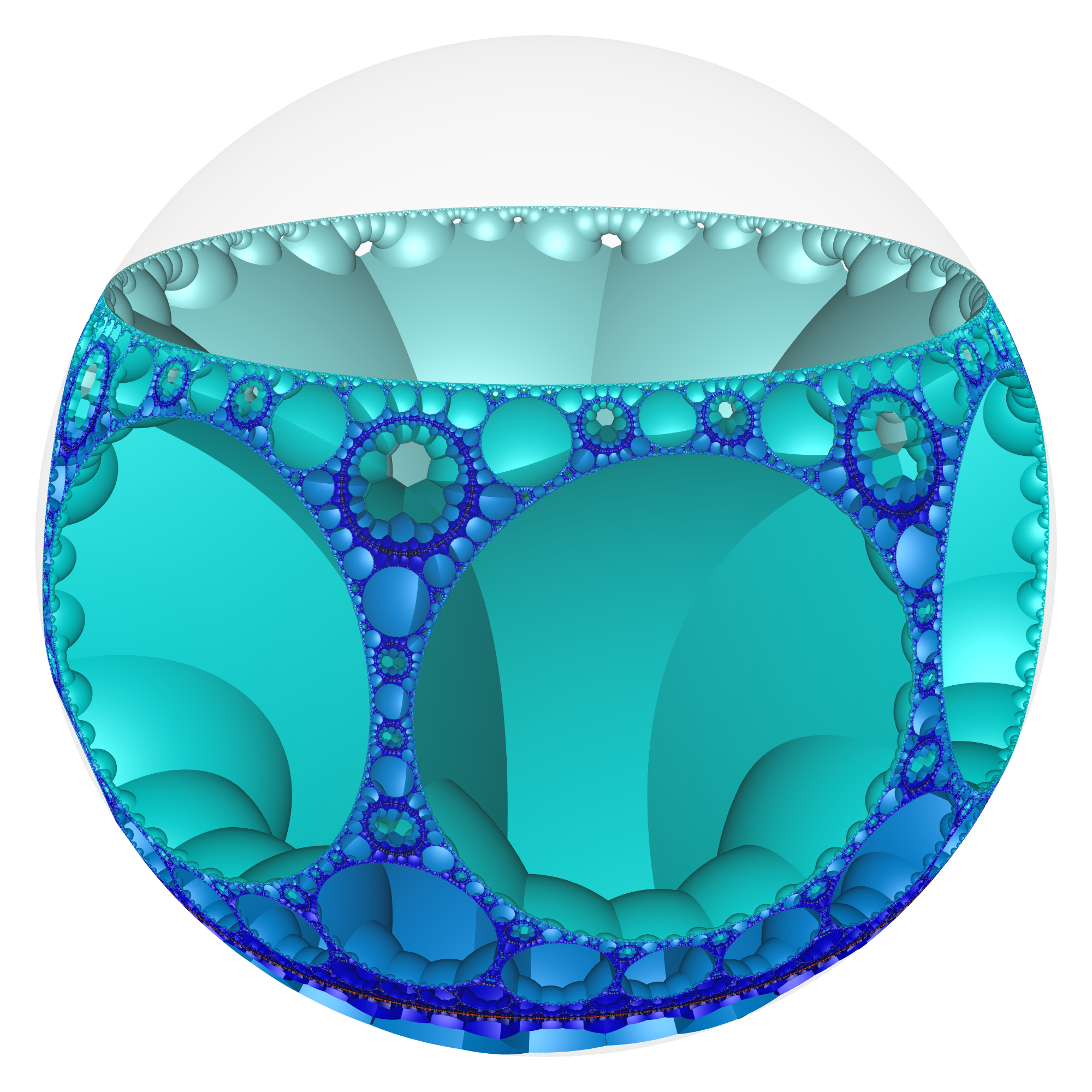
Poincaré disk model

=== Order-8-3 hexagonal honeycomb ===
Order-8-3 hexagonal honeycomb
Type	Regular honeycomb
Schläfli symbol	{6,8,3}
Coxeter diagram	
Cells	{6,8}
Faces	{6}
Vertex figure	{8,3}
Dual	{3,8,6}
Coxeter group	[6,8,3]
Properties	Regular

In the geometry of hyperbolic 3-space, the order-8-3 hexagonal honeycomb (or 6,8,3 honeycomb) a regular space-filling tessellation (or honeycomb). Each infinite cell consists of an order-6 hexagonal tiling whose vertices lie on a 2-hypercycle, each of which has a limiting circle on the ideal sphere.

The Schläfli symbol of the order-8-3 hexagonal honeycomb is {6,8,3}, with three order-5 hexagonal tilings meeting at each edge. The vertex figure of this honeycomb is an octagonal tiling, {8,3}.

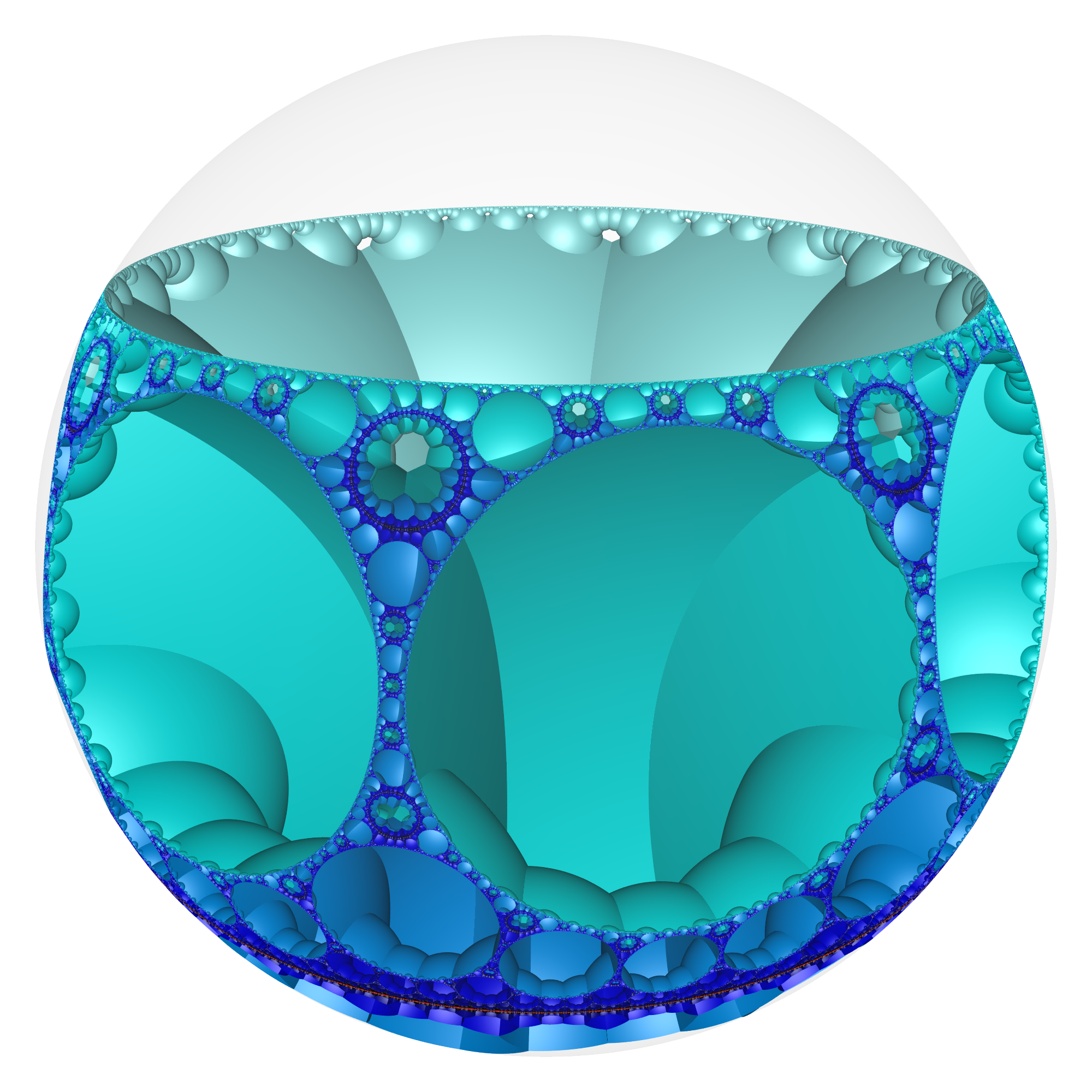
Poincaré disk model

=== Order-8-3 apeirogonal honeycomb ===
Order-8-3 apeirogonal honeycomb
Type	Regular honeycomb
Schläfli symbol	{∞,8,3}
Coxeter diagram	
Cells	{∞,8}
Faces	Apeirogon {∞}
Vertex figure	{8,3}
Dual	{3,8,∞}
Coxeter group	[∞,8,3]
Properties	Regular

In the geometry of hyperbolic 3-space, the order-8-3 apeirogonal honeycomb (or ∞,8,3 honeycomb) a regular space-filling tessellation (or honeycomb). Each infinite cell consists of an order-8 apeirogonal tiling whose vertices lie on a 2-hypercycle, each of which has a limiting circle on the ideal sphere.

The Schläfli symbol of the apeirogonal tiling honeycomb is {∞,8,3}, with three order-8 apeirogonal tilings meeting at each edge. The vertex figure of this honeycomb is an octagonal tiling, {8,3}.

The "ideal surface" projection below is a plane-at-infinity, in the Poincaré half-space model of H3. It shows an Apollonian gasket pattern of circles inside a largest circle.

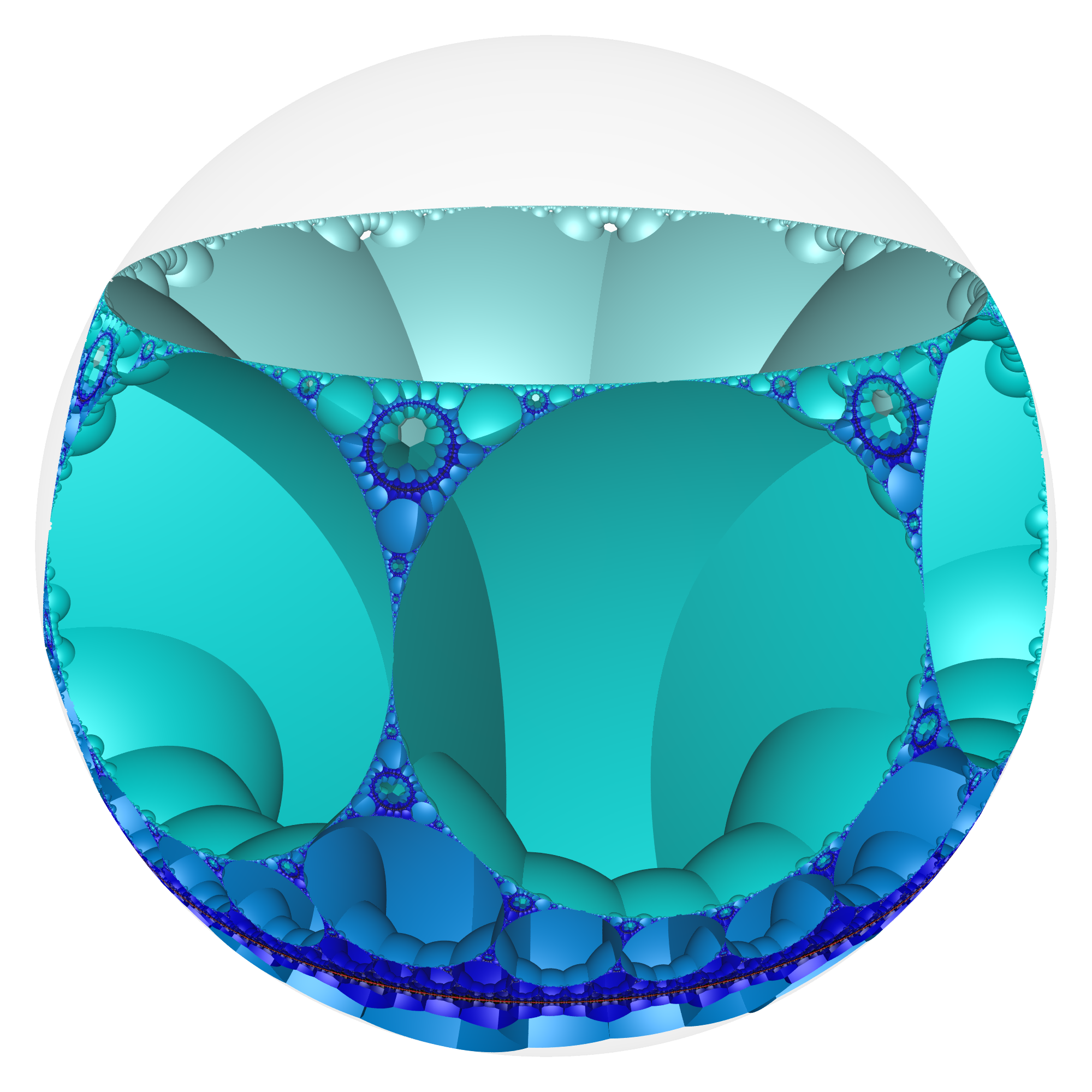
Poincaré disk model

=== Order-8-4 square honeycomb ===
Order-8-4 square honeycomb
Type	Regular honeycomb
Schläfli symbol	{4,8,4}
Coxeter diagrams	=
Cells	{4,8}
Faces	{4}
Edge figure	{4}
Vertex figure	{8,4}
Dual	self-dual
Coxeter group	[4,8,4]
Properties	Regular

In the geometry of hyperbolic 3-space, the order-8-4 square honeycomb (or 4,8,4 honeycomb) a regular space-filling tessellation (or honeycomb) with Schläfli symbol {4,8,4}.

All vertices are ultra-ideal (existing beyond the ideal boundary) with four order-5 square tilings existing around each edge and with an order-4 octagonal tiling vertex figure.

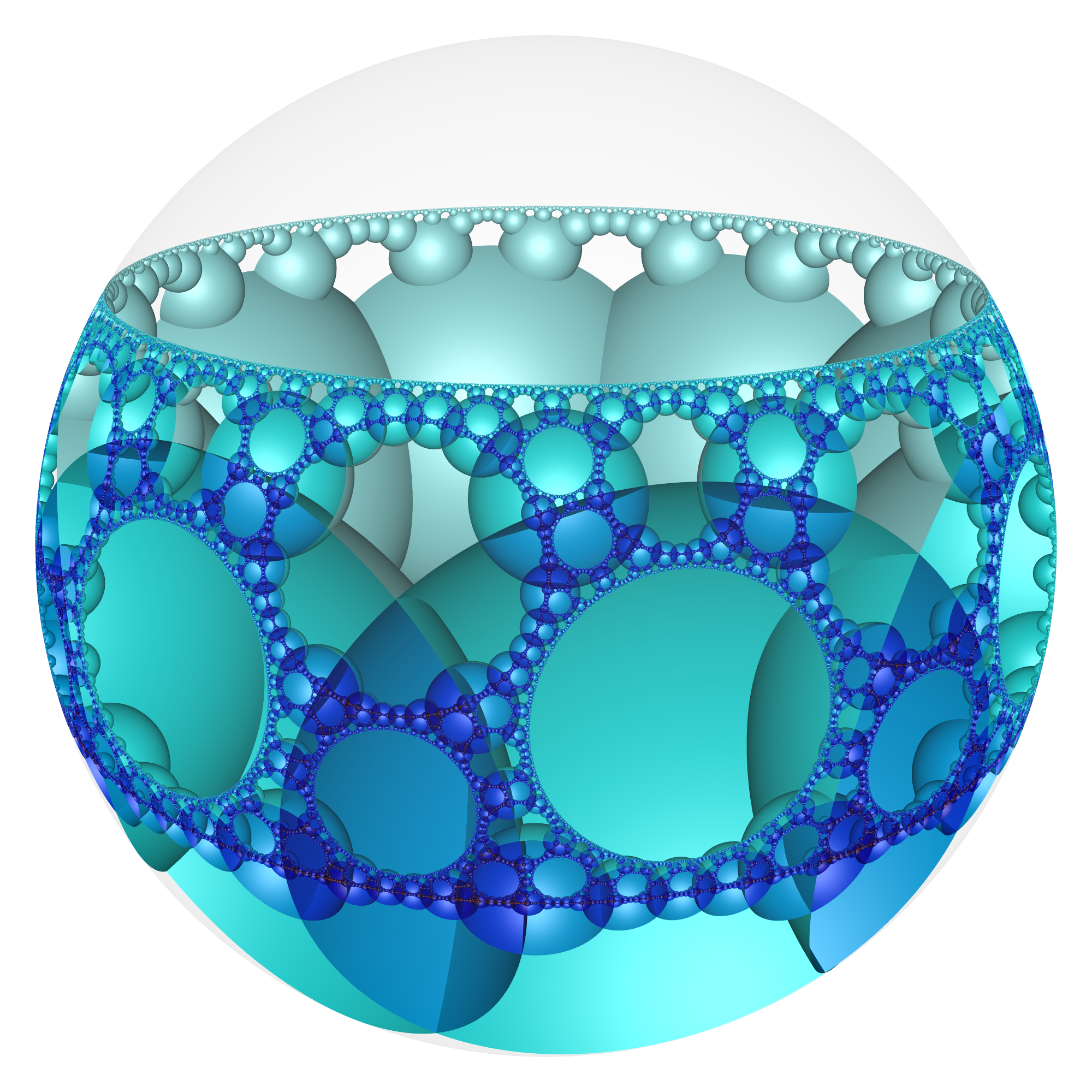
Poincaré disk model

=== Order-8-5 pentagonal honeycomb ===
Order-8-5 pentagonal honeycomb
Type	Regular honeycomb
Schläfli symbol	{5,8,5}
Coxeter diagrams	
Cells	{5,8}
Faces	{5}
Edge figure	{5}
Vertex figure	{8,5}
Dual	self-dual
Coxeter group	[5,8,5]
Properties	Regular

In the geometry of hyperbolic 3-space, the order-8-5 pentagonal honeycomb (or 5,8,5 honeycomb) a regular space-filling tessellation (or honeycomb) with Schläfli symbol {5,8,5}.

All vertices are ultra-ideal (existing beyond the ideal boundary) with five order-8 pentagonal tilings existing around each edge and with an order-5 pentagonal tiling vertex figure.

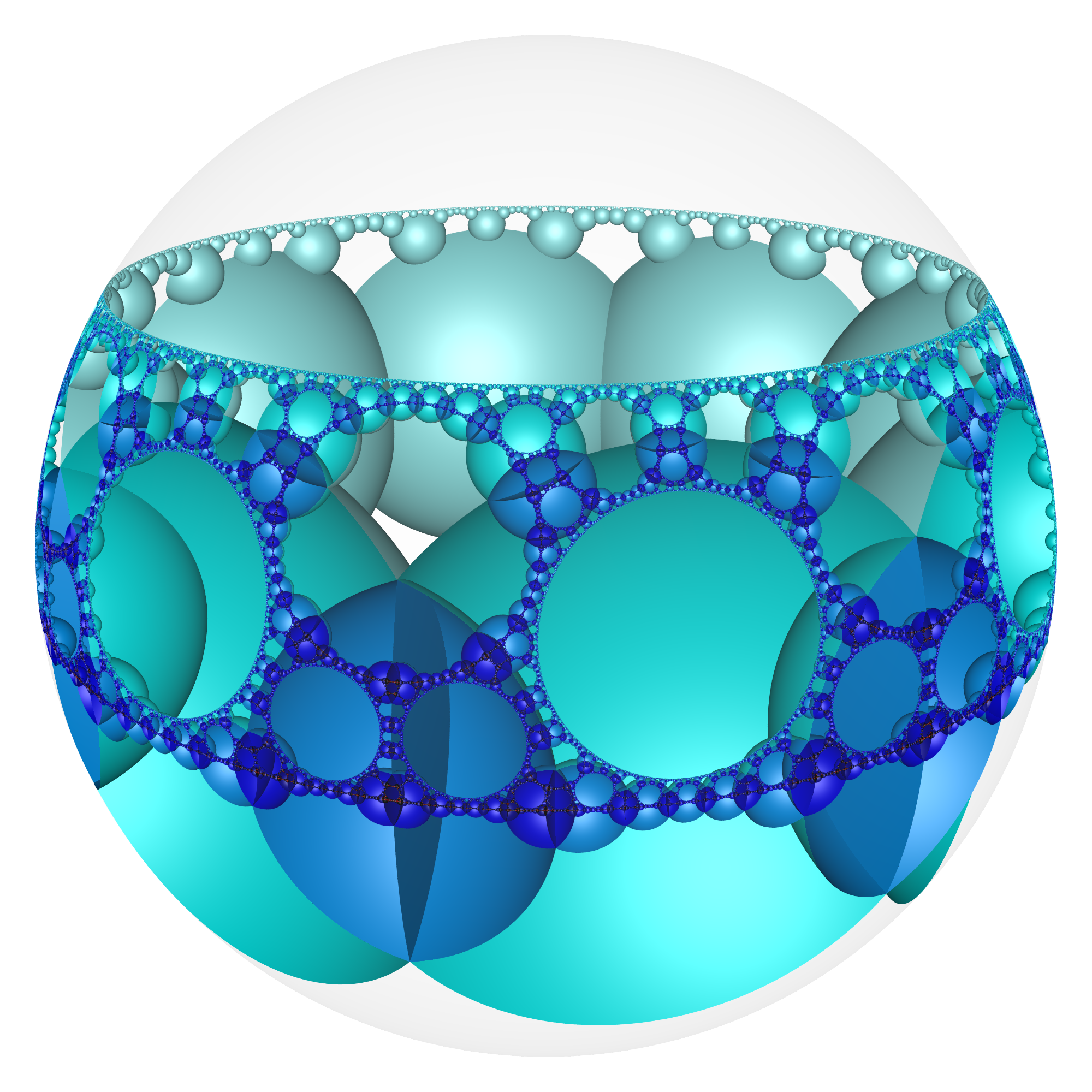
Poincaré disk model

=== Order-8-6 hexagonal honeycomb ===
Order-8-6 hexagonal honeycomb
Type	Regular honeycomb
Schläfli symbols	{6,8,6} {6,(8,3,8)}
Coxeter diagrams	=
Cells	{6,8}
Faces	{6}
Edge figure	{6}
Vertex figure	{8,6} {(5,3,5)}
Dual	self-dual
Coxeter group	[6,8,6] [6,((8,3,8))]
Properties	Regular

In the geometry of hyperbolic 3-space, the order-8-6 hexagonal honeycomb (or 6,8,6 honeycomb) is a regular space-filling tessellation (or honeycomb) with Schläfli symbol {6,8,6}. It has six order-8 hexagonal tilings, {6,8}, around each edge. All vertices are ultra-ideal (existing beyond the ideal boundary) with infinitely many hexagonal tilings existing around each vertex in an order-6 octagonal tiling vertex arrangement.

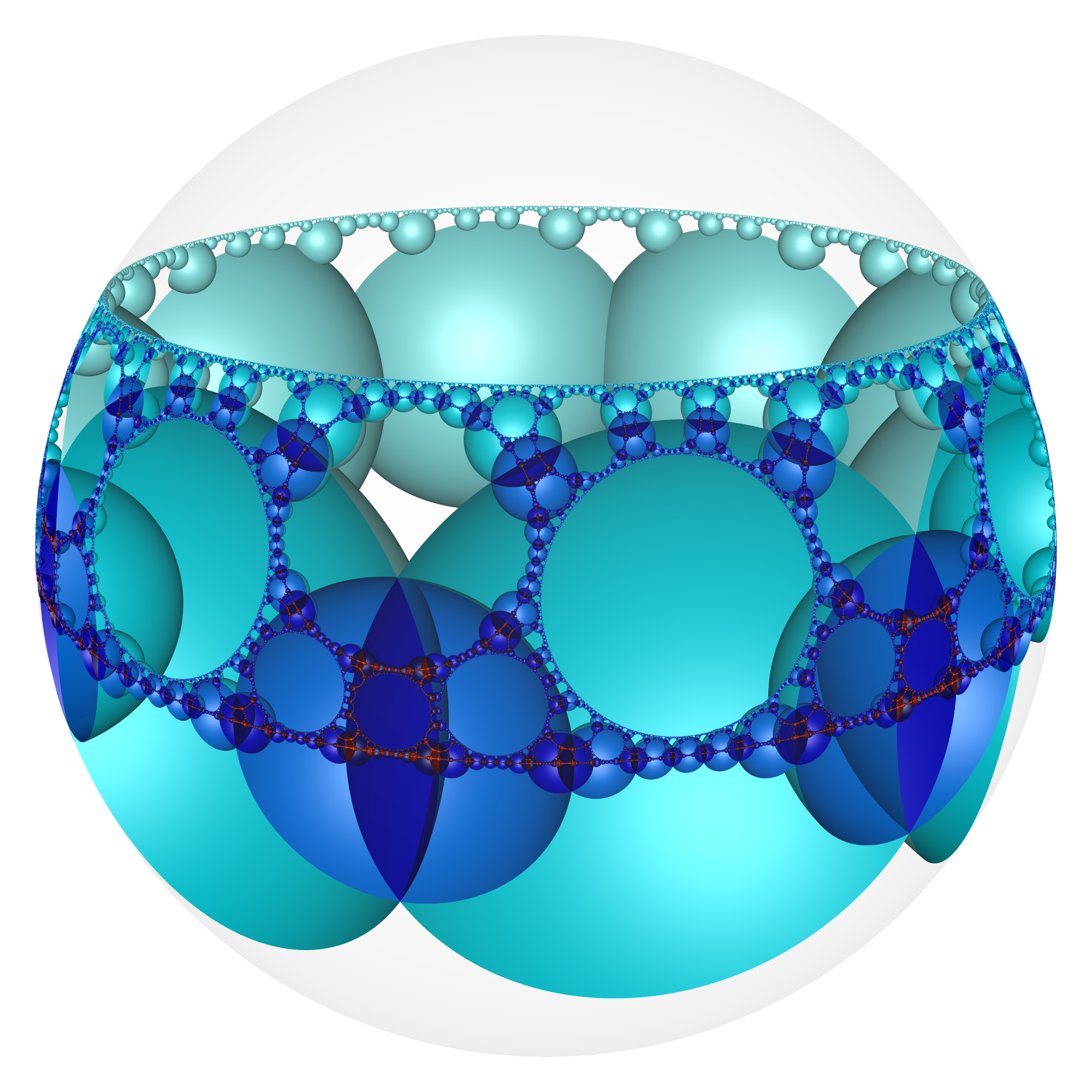
Poincaré disk model

It has a second construction as a uniform honeycomb, Schläfli symbol {6,(8,3,8)}, Coxeter diagram,, with alternating types or colors of cells. In Coxeter notation the half symmetry is [6,8,6,1^{+}] = [6,((8,3,8))].

=== Order-8-infinite apeirogonal honeycomb ===
Order-8-infinite apeirogonal honeycomb
Type	Regular honeycomb
Schläfli symbols	{∞,8,∞} {∞,(8,∞,8)}
Coxeter diagrams	↔
Cells	{∞,8}
Faces	{∞}
Edge figure	{∞}
Vertex figure	{8,∞} {(8,∞,8)}
Dual	self-dual
Coxeter group	[∞,8,∞] [∞,((8,∞,8))]
Properties	Regular

In the geometry of hyperbolic 3-space, the order-8-infinite apeirogonal honeycomb (or ∞,8,∞ honeycomb) is a regular space-filling tessellation (or honeycomb) with Schläfli symbol {∞,8,∞}. It has infinitely many order-8 apeirogonal tiling {∞,8} around each edge. All vertices are ultra-ideal (existing beyond the ideal boundary) with infinitely many order-8 apeirogonal tilings existing around each vertex in an infinite-order octagonal tiling vertex figure.

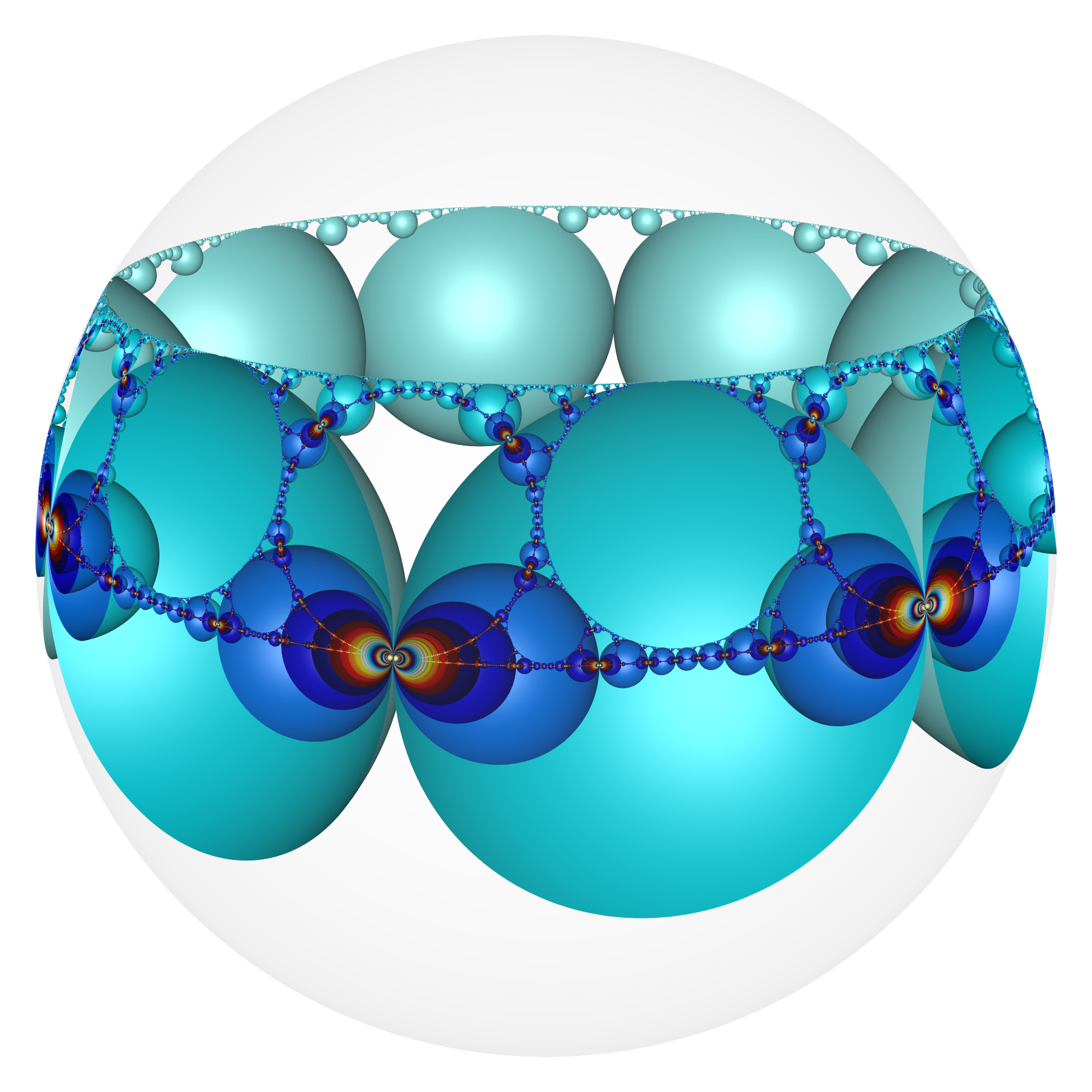
Poincaré disk model

It has a second construction as a uniform honeycomb, Schläfli symbol {∞,(8,∞,8)}, Coxeter diagram,, with alternating types or colors of cells.

== See also ==
- Convex uniform honeycombs in hyperbolic space
- List of regular polytopes
