= Circle Limit III =

1959 woodcut by M. C. Escher

Circle Limit III, 1959

Circle Limit III is a woodcut made in 1959 by Dutch artist M. C. Escher, in which "strings of fish shoot up like rockets from infinitely far away" and then "fall back again whence they came".

It is one of a series of four woodcuts by Escher depicting ideas from hyperbolic geometry. Dutch physicist and mathematician Bruno Ernst called it "the best of the four".

== Inspiration ==
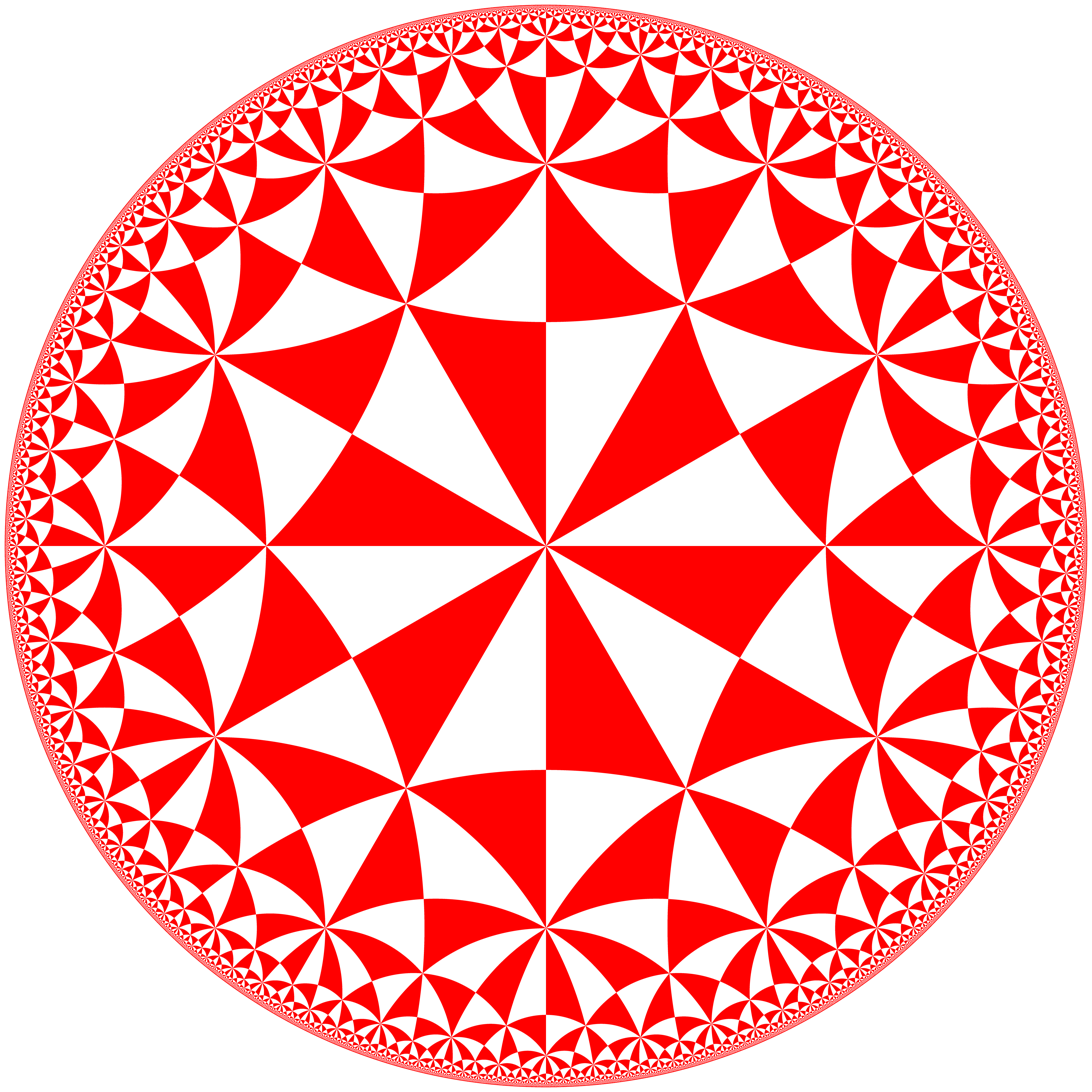
The (6,4,2) triangular hyperbolic tiling that inspired Escher

Escher became interested in tessellations of the plane after a 1936 visit to the Alhambra in Granada, Spain, and from the time of his 1937 artwork Metamorphosis I he had begun incorporating tessellated human and animal figures into his artworks.

In a 1958 letter from Escher to H. S. M. Coxeter, Escher wrote that he was inspired to make his Circle Limit series by a figure in Coxeter's article "Crystal Symmetry and its Generalizations". Coxeter's figure depicts a tessellation of the hyperbolic plane by right triangles with angles of 30°, 45°, and 90°; triangles with these angles are possible in hyperbolic geometry but not in Euclidean geometry. This tessellation may be interpreted as depicting the lines of reflection and fundamental domains of the (6,4,2) triangle group. An elementary analysis of Coxeter's figure, as Escher might have understood it, is given by Casselman (2010).

== Geometry ==
The alternated octagonal tiling, a hyperbolic tiling of squares and equilateral triangles, overlaid on Escher's image

Escher seems to have believed that the white curves of his woodcut, which bisect the fish, represent hyperbolic lines in the Poincaré disk model of the hyperbolic plane, in which the whole hyperbolic plane is modeled as a disk in the Euclidean plane, and hyperbolic lines are modeled as circular arcs perpendicular to the disk boundary. Indeed, Escher wrote that the fish move "perpendicularly to the boundary". However, as Coxeter demonstrated, there is no hyperbolic arrangement of lines whose faces are alternately squares and equilateral triangles, as the figure depicts. Rather, the white curves are hypercycles that meet the boundary circle at angles of cos^{−1} (2^{1/4} − 2^{−1/4})/2, approximately 80°.

The symmetry axes of the triangles and squares that lie between the white lines are true hyperbolic lines. The squares and triangles of the woodcut closely resemble the alternated octagonal tiling of the hyperbolic plane, which also features squares and triangles meeting in the same incidence pattern. However, the precise geometry of these shapes is not the same. In the alternated octagonal tiling, the sides of the squares and triangles are hyperbolically straight line segments, which do not link up in smooth curves; instead they form polygonal chains with corners. In Escher's woodcut, the sides of the squares and triangles are formed by arcs of hypercycles, which are not straight in hyperbolic geometry, but which connect smoothly to each other without corners.

The points at the centers of the squares, where four fish meet at their fins, form the vertices of an order-8 triangular tiling, while the points where three fish fins meet and the points where three white lines cross together form the vertices of its dual, the octagonal tiling. Similar tessellations by lines of fish may be constructed for other hyperbolic tilings formed by polygons other than triangles and squares, or with more than three white curves at each crossing.

Euclidean coordinates of circles containing the three most prominent white curves in the woodcut may be obtained by calculations in the field of rational numbers extended by the square roots of two and three.

== Symmetry ==
Viewed as a pattern, ignoring the colors of the fish, in the hyperbolic plane, the woodcut has three-fold and four-fold rotational symmetry at the centers of its triangles and squares, respectively, and order-three rotational symmetry at the points where the white curves cross. In John Conway's orbifold notation, this set of symmetries is denoted 433. Each fish provides a fundamental region for this symmetry group. Contrary to appearances, the fish do not have bilateral symmetry: the white curves of the drawing are not axes of reflection symmetry. For example, the angle at the back of the right fin is 90° (where four fins meet), but at the back of the much smaller left fin it is 120° (where three fins meet).

== Printing details ==
The fish in Circle Limit III are depicted in four colors, allowing each string of fish to have a single color and each two adjacent fish to have different colors. Together with the black ink used to outline the fish, the overall woodcut has five colors. It is printed from five wood blocks, each of which provides one of the colors within a quarter of the disk, for a total of 20 impressions. The diameter of the outer circle, as printed, is 41.5 cm (16 3/8 in).

== Exhibits ==
As well as being included in the collection of the Escher Museum in The Hague, copies of Circle Limit III are included in the collections of the National Gallery of Art in the USA and the National Gallery of Canada.
