= Truncated octagonal tiling =

Concept in mathematics

Truncated octagonal tiling
Poincaré disk model of the hyperbolic plane
Type	Hyperbolic uniform tiling
Vertex configuration	3.16.16
Schläfli symbol	t{8,3}
Wythoff symbol	2 3 | 8
Coxeter diagram	
Symmetry group	[8,3], (*832)
Dual	Order-8 triakis triangular tiling
Properties	Vertex-transitive

In geometry, the truncated octagonal tiling is a semiregular tiling of the hyperbolic plane. There is one triangle and two hexakaidecagons on each vertex. It has Schläfli symbol of t{8,3}.

== Dual tiling ==
The dual tiling has face configuration V3.16.16.

== Related polyhedra and tilings ==
This hyperbolic tiling is topologically related as a part of sequence of uniform truncated polyhedra with vertex configurations (3.2n.2n), and [n,3] Coxeter group symmetry.

*n32 symmetry mutation of truncated tilings: t{n,3}
Symmetry *n32 [n,3]	Spherical				Euclid.	Compact hyperb.		Paraco.	Noncompact hyperbolic		
Symmetry *n32 [n,3]	*232 [2,3]	*332 [3,3]	*432 [4,3]	*532 [5,3]	*632 [6,3]	*732 [7,3]	*832 [8,3]...	*∞32 [∞,3]	[12i,3]	[9i,3]	[6i,3]
Truncated figures											
Symbol	t{2,3}	t{3,3}	t{4,3}	t{5,3}	t{6,3}	t{7,3}	t{8,3}	t{∞,3}	t{12i,3}	t{9i,3}	t{6i,3}
Triakis figures											
Config.	V3.4.4	V3.6.6	V3.8.8	V3.10.10	V3.12.12	V3.14.14	V3.16.16	V3.∞.∞			

From a Wythoff construction there are ten hyperbolic uniform tilings that can be based from the regular octagonal tiling.

Drawing the tiles colored as red on the original faces, yellow at the original vertices, and blue along the original edges, there are 8 forms.

Uniform octagonal/triangular tilings
Symmetry: [8,3], (*832)							[8,3]^{+} (832)	[1^{+},8,3] (*443)		[8,3^{+}] (3*4)
{8,3}	t{8,3}	r{8,3}	t{3,8}	{3,8}	rr{8,3} s_{2}{3,8}	tr{8,3}	sr{8,3}	h{8,3}	h_{2}{8,3}	s{3,8}
								or	or	
Uniform duals
V8^{3}	V3.16.16	V3.8.3.8	V6.6.8	V3^{8}	V3.4.8.4	V4.6.16	V3^{4}.8	V(3.4)^{3}	V8.6.6	V3^{5}.4

== See also ==
- Truncated hexagonal tiling
- Octagonal tiling
- Tilings of regular polygons
- List of uniform tilings
