= Truncated order-8 triangular tiling =

Semiregular tiling of the hyperbolic plane

Truncated order-8 triangular tiling
Poincaré disk model of the hyperbolic plane
Type	Hyperbolic uniform tiling
Vertex configuration	8.6.6
Schläfli symbol	t{3,8}
Wythoff symbol	2 8 | 3; 4 3 3 |
Coxeter diagram	
Symmetry group	[8,3], (*832) [(4,3,3)], (*433)
Dual	Octakis octagonal tiling
Properties	Vertex-transitive

In geometry, the truncated order-8 triangular tiling is a semiregular tiling of the hyperbolic plane. There are two hexagons and one octagon on each vertex. It has Schläfli symbol of t{3,8}.

== Uniform colors ==
The half symmetry [1^{+},8,3] = [(4,3,3)] can be shown with alternating two colors of hexagons	Dual tiling

== Symmetry ==
The dual of this tiling represents the fundamental domains of *443 symmetry. It only has one subgroup 443, replacing mirrors with gyration points.

This symmetry can be doubled to 832 symmetry by adding a bisecting mirror to the fundamental domain.

Small index subgroups of [(4,3,3)], (*433)
Type	Reflectional	Rotational
Index	1	2
Diagram		
Coxeter (orbifold)	[(4,3,3)] = (*433)	[(4,3,3)]^{+} = (433)

== Related tilings ==
From a Wythoff construction there are ten hyperbolic uniform tilings that can be based from the regular octagonal tiling.

Uniform octagonal/triangular tilings
Symmetry: [8,3], (*832)							[8,3]^{+} (832)	[1^{+},8,3] (*443)		[8,3^{+}] (3*4)
{8,3}	t{8,3}	r{8,3}	t{3,8}	{3,8}	rr{8,3} s_{2}{3,8}	tr{8,3}	sr{8,3}	h{8,3}	h_{2}{8,3}	s{3,8}
								or	or	
Uniform duals
V8^{3}	V3.16.16	V3.8.3.8	V6.6.8	V3^{8}	V3.4.8.4	V4.6.16	V3^{4}.8	V(3.4)^{3}	V8.6.6	V3^{5}.4

It can also be generated from the (4 3 3) hyperbolic tilings:

Uniform (4,3,3) tilings
Symmetry: [(4,3,3)], (*433)							[(4,3,3)]^{+}, (433)
h{8,3} t_{0}(4,3,3)	r{3,8}^{1}/_{2} t_{0,1}(4,3,3)	h{8,3} t_{1}(4,3,3)	h_{2}{8,3} t_{1,2}(4,3,3)	{3,8}^{1}/_{2} t_{2}(4,3,3)	h_{2}{8,3} t_{0,2}(4,3,3)	t{3,8}^{1}/_{2} t_{0,1,2}(4,3,3)	s{3,8}^{1}/_{2} s(4,3,3)
Uniform duals
V(3.4)^{3}	V3.8.3.8	V(3.4)^{3}	V3.6.4.6	V(3.3)^{4}	V3.6.4.6	V6.6.8	V3.3.3.3.3.4

This hyperbolic tiling is topologically related as a part of sequence of uniform truncated polyhedra with vertex configurations (n.6.6), and [n,3] Coxeter group symmetry.

*n32 symmetry mutation of truncated tilings: n.6.6
Sym. *n42 [n,3]	Spherical				Euclid.	Compact		Parac.	Noncompact hyperbolic		
Sym. *n42 [n,3]	*232 [2,3]	*332 [3,3]	*432 [4,3]	*532 [5,3]	*632 [6,3]	*732 [7,3]	*832 [8,3]...	*∞32 [∞,3]	[12i,3]	[9i,3]	[6i,3]
Truncated figures											
Config.	2.6.6	3.6.6	4.6.6	5.6.6	6.6.6	7.6.6	8.6.6	∞.6.6	12i.6.6	9i.6.6	6i.6.6
n-kis figures											
Config.	V2.6.6	V3.6.6	V4.6.6	V5.6.6	V6.6.6	V7.6.6	V8.6.6	V∞.6.6	V12i.6.6	V9i.6.6	V6i.6.6

*n32 symmetry mutation of omnitruncated tilings: 6.8.2n
Sym. *n43 [(n,4,3)]	Spherical	Compact hyperbolic						Paraco.
Sym. *n43 [(n,4,3)]	*243 [4,3]	*343 [(3,4,3)]	*443 [(4,4,3)]	*543 [(5,4,3)]	*643 [(6,4,3)]	*743 [(7,4,3)]	*843 [(8,4,3)]	*∞43 [(∞,4,3)]
Figures								
Config.	4.8.6	6.8.6	8.8.6	10.8.6	12.8.6	14.8.6	16.8.6	∞.8.6
Duals								
Config.	V4.8.6	V6.8.6	V8.8.6	V10.8.6	V12.8.6	V14.8.6	V16.8.6	V6.8.∞

== See also ==
- Triangular tiling
- Order-3 octagonal tiling
- Order-8 triangular tiling
- Tilings of regular polygons
- List of uniform tilings
