= Truncated order-3 apeirogonal tiling =

Concept in mathematics

Truncated order-3 apeirogonal tiling
Poincaré disk model of the hyperbolic plane
Type	Hyperbolic uniform tiling
Vertex configuration	3.∞.∞
Schläfli symbol	t{∞,3}
Wythoff symbol	2 3 | ∞
Coxeter diagram	
Symmetry group	[∞,3], (*∞32)
Dual	Infinite-order triakis triangular tiling
Properties	Vertex-transitive

In geometry, the truncated order-3 apeirogonal tiling is a uniform tiling of the hyperbolic plane with a Schläfli symbol of t{∞,3}.

== Dual tiling ==
The dual tiling, the infinite-order triakis triangular tiling, has face configuration V3.∞.∞.

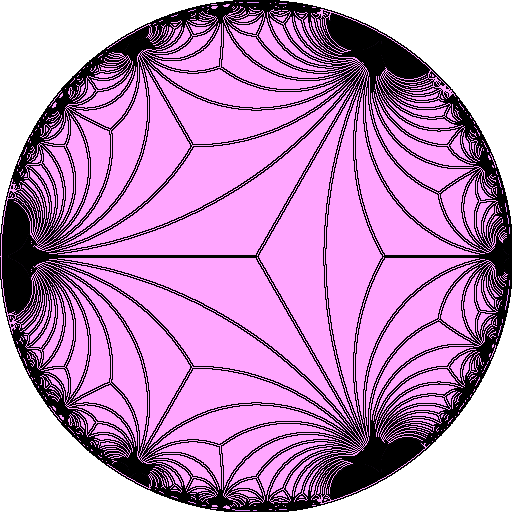

== Related polyhedra and tiling ==
This hyperbolic tiling is topologically related as a part of sequence of uniform truncated polyhedra with vertex configurations (3.2n.2n), and [n,3] Coxeter group symmetry.

*n32 symmetry mutation of truncated tilings: t{n,3}
Symmetry *n32 [n,3]	Spherical				Euclid.	Compact hyperb.		Paraco.	Noncompact hyperbolic		
Symmetry *n32 [n,3]	*232 [2,3]	*332 [3,3]	*432 [4,3]	*532 [5,3]	*632 [6,3]	*732 [7,3]	*832 [8,3]...	*∞32 [∞,3]	[12i,3]	[9i,3]	[6i,3]
Truncated figures											
Symbol	t{2,3}	t{3,3}	t{4,3}	t{5,3}	t{6,3}	t{7,3}	t{8,3}	t{∞,3}	t{12i,3}	t{9i,3}	t{6i,3}
Triakis figures											
Config.	V3.4.4	V3.6.6	V3.8.8	V3.10.10	V3.12.12	V3.14.14	V3.16.16	V3.∞.∞			

Paracompact uniform tilings in [∞,3] family
Symmetry: [∞,3], (*∞32)							[∞,3]^{+} (∞32)	[1^{+},∞,3] (*∞33)		[∞,3^{+}] (3*∞)
		=	=	=				= or	= or	=
{∞,3}	t{∞,3}	r{∞,3}	t{3,∞}	{3,∞}	rr{∞,3}	tr{∞,3}	sr{∞,3}	h{∞,3}	h_{2}{∞,3}	s{3,∞}
Uniform duals
V∞^{3}	V3.∞.∞	V(3.∞)^{2}	V6.6.∞	V3^{∞}	V4.3.4.∞	V4.6.∞	V3.3.3.3.∞	V(3.∞)^{3}		V3.3.3.3.3.∞

== See also ==
- List of uniform planar tilings
- Tilings of regular polygons
- Uniform tilings in hyperbolic plane
