= Snub order-8 triangular tiling =

Concept in mathematics

Snub order-8 triangular tiling
Poincaré disk model of the hyperbolic plane
Type	Hyperbolic uniform tiling
Vertex configuration	3.3.3.3.3.4
Schläfli symbol	s{3,8} s(4,3,3)
Wythoff symbol	| 4 3 3
Coxeter diagram	
Symmetry group	[8,3^{+}], (3*4) [(4,3,3)]^{+}, (433)
Dual	Order-4-3-3 snub dual tiling
Properties	Vertex-transitive

In geometry, the snub tritetratrigonal tiling or snub order-8 triangular tiling is a uniform tiling of the hyperbolic plane. It has Schläfli symbols of s{(3,4,3)} and s{3,8}.

== Images ==
Drawn in chiral pairs:

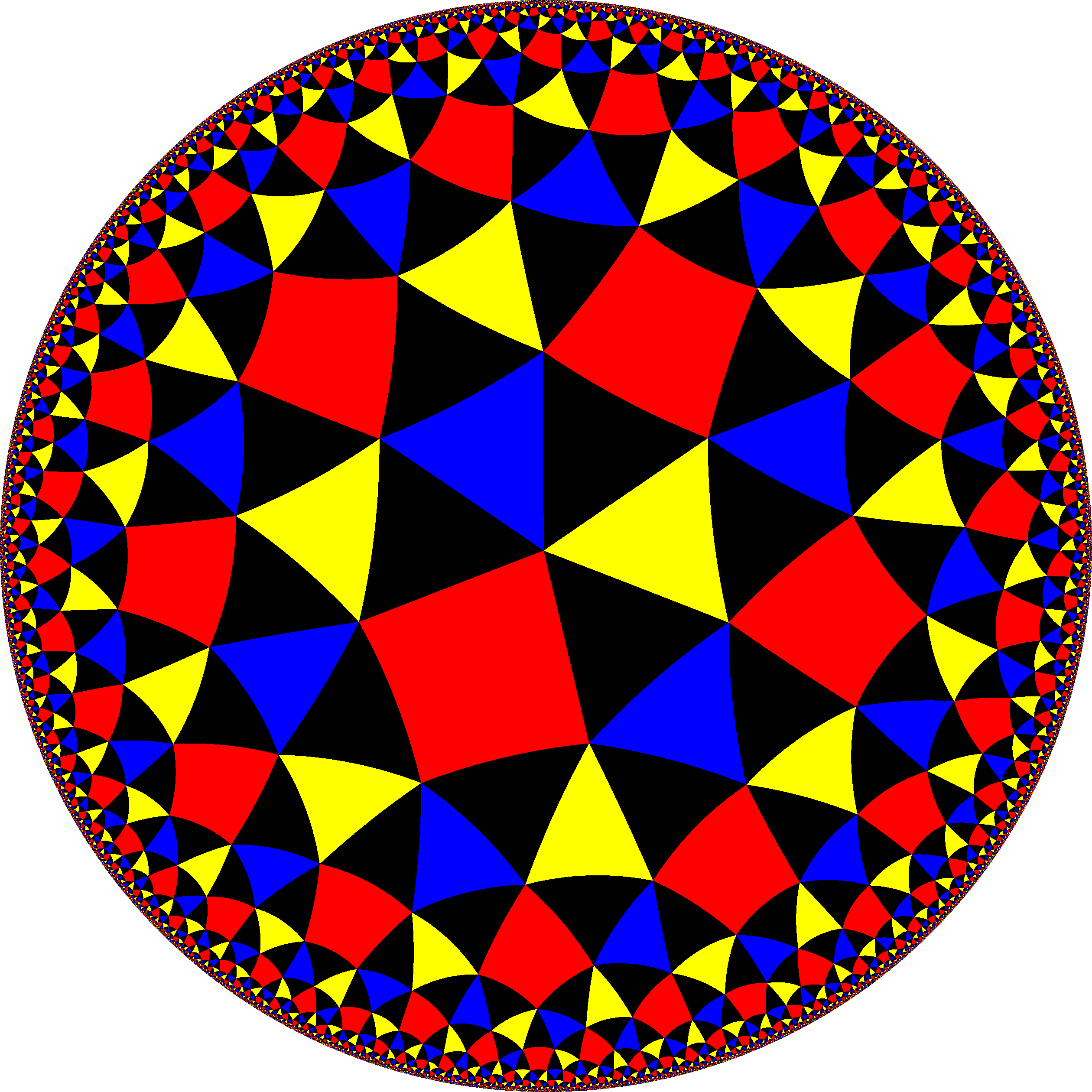
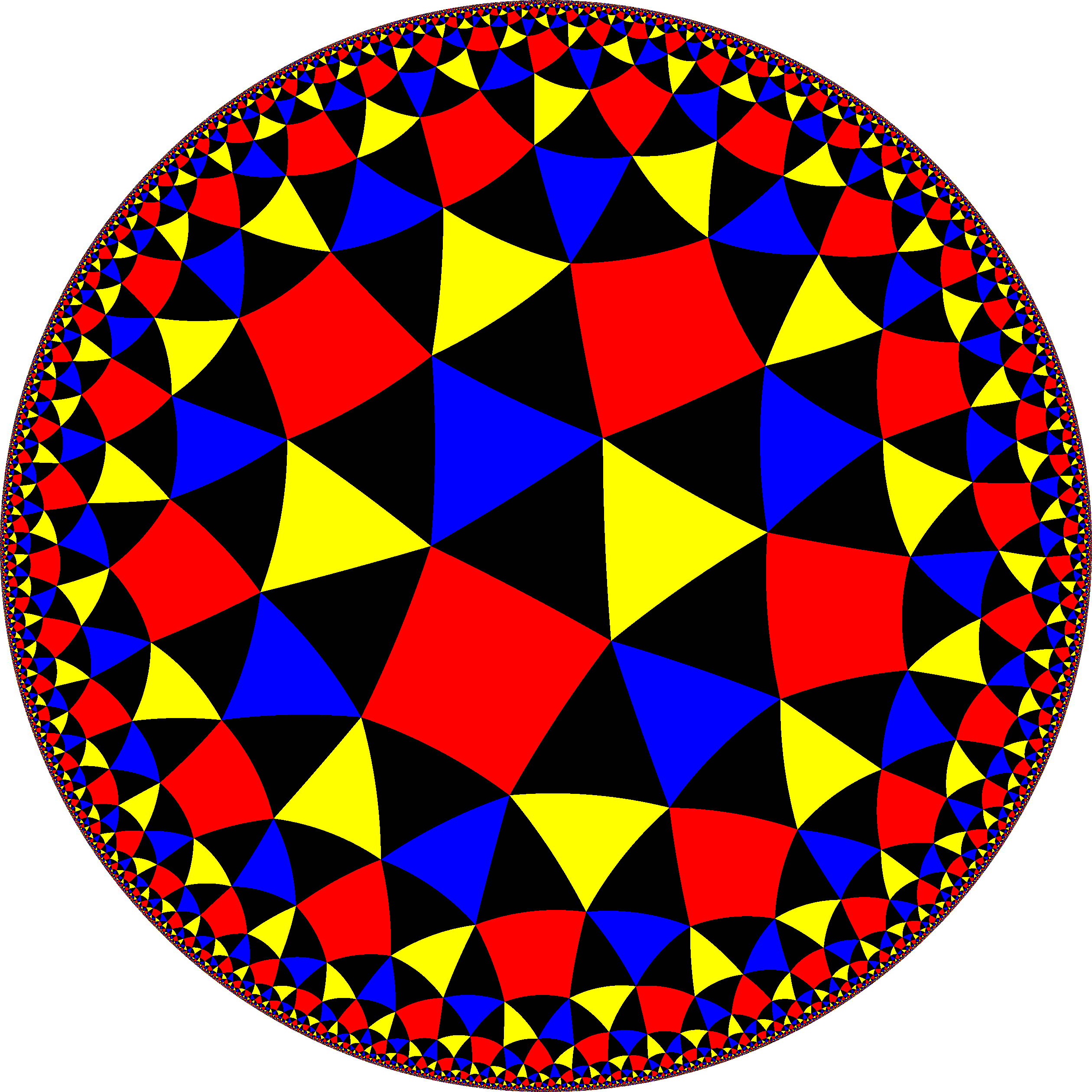

== Symmetry ==
The alternated construction from the truncated order-8 triangular tiling has 2 colors of triangles and achiral symmetry. It has Schläfli symbol of s{3,8}.

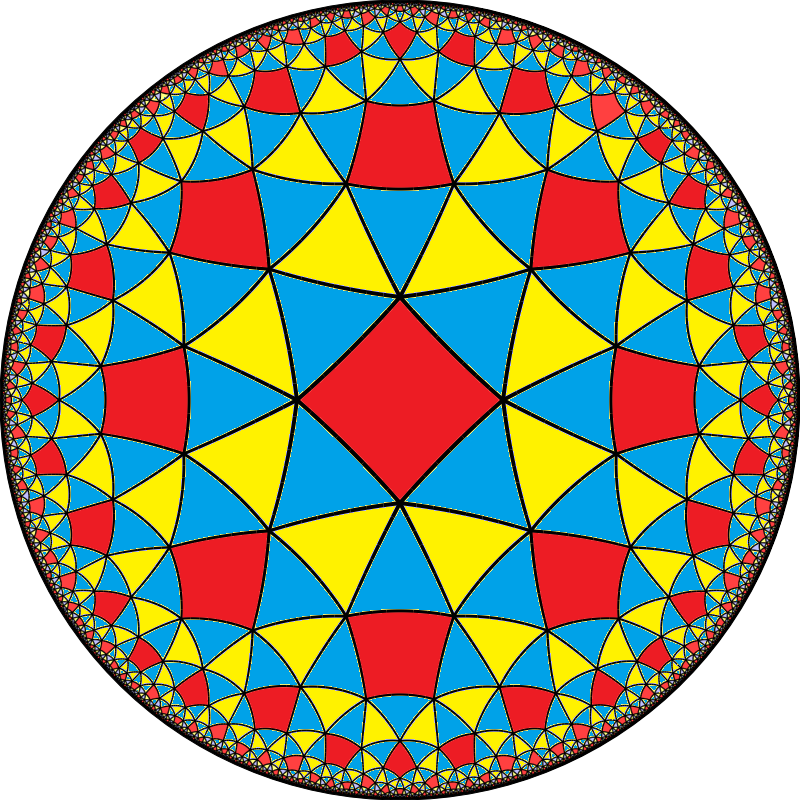

== Related polyhedra and tiling ==
Uniform (4,3,3) tilings
Symmetry: [(4,3,3)], (*433)							[(4,3,3)]^{+}, (433)
h{8,3} t_{0}(4,3,3)	r{3,8}^{1}/_{2} t_{0,1}(4,3,3)	h{8,3} t_{1}(4,3,3)	h_{2}{8,3} t_{1,2}(4,3,3)	{3,8}^{1}/_{2} t_{2}(4,3,3)	h_{2}{8,3} t_{0,2}(4,3,3)	t{3,8}^{1}/_{2} t_{0,1,2}(4,3,3)	s{3,8}^{1}/_{2} s(4,3,3)
Uniform duals
V(3.4)^{3}	V3.8.3.8	V(3.4)^{3}	V3.6.4.6	V(3.3)^{4}	V3.6.4.6	V6.6.8	V3.3.3.3.3.4

Uniform octagonal/triangular tilings
Symmetry: [8,3], (*832)							[8,3]^{+} (832)	[1^{+},8,3] (*443)		[8,3^{+}] (3*4)
{8,3}	t{8,3}	r{8,3}	t{3,8}	{3,8}	rr{8,3} s_{2}{3,8}	tr{8,3}	sr{8,3}	h{8,3}	h_{2}{8,3}	s{3,8}
								or	or	
Uniform duals
V8^{3}	V3.16.16	V3.8.3.8	V6.6.8	V3^{8}	V3.4.8.4	V4.6.16	V3^{4}.8	V(3.4)^{3}	V8.6.6	V3^{5}.4

== See also ==
- Square tiling
- Uniform tilings in hyperbolic plane
- List of regular polytopes
