= Truncated order-6 hexagonal tiling =

Uniform tiling of the hyperbolic plane

Truncated order-6 hexagonal tiling
Poincaré disk model of the hyperbolic plane
Type	Hyperbolic uniform tiling
Vertex configuration	6.12.12
Schläfli symbol	t{6,6} or h_{2}{4,6} t(6,6,3)
Wythoff symbol	2 6 | 6; 3 6 6 |
Coxeter diagram	= =
Symmetry group	[6,6], (*662) [(6,6,3)], (*663)
Dual	Order-6 hexakis hexagonal tiling
Properties	Vertex-transitive

In geometry, the truncated order-6 hexagonal tiling is a uniform tiling of the hyperbolic plane. It has Schläfli symbol of t{6,6}. It can also be identically constructed as a cantic order-6 square tiling, h_{2}{4,6}

== Uniform colorings ==
By *663 symmetry, this tiling can be constructed as an omnitruncation, t{(6,6,3)}:

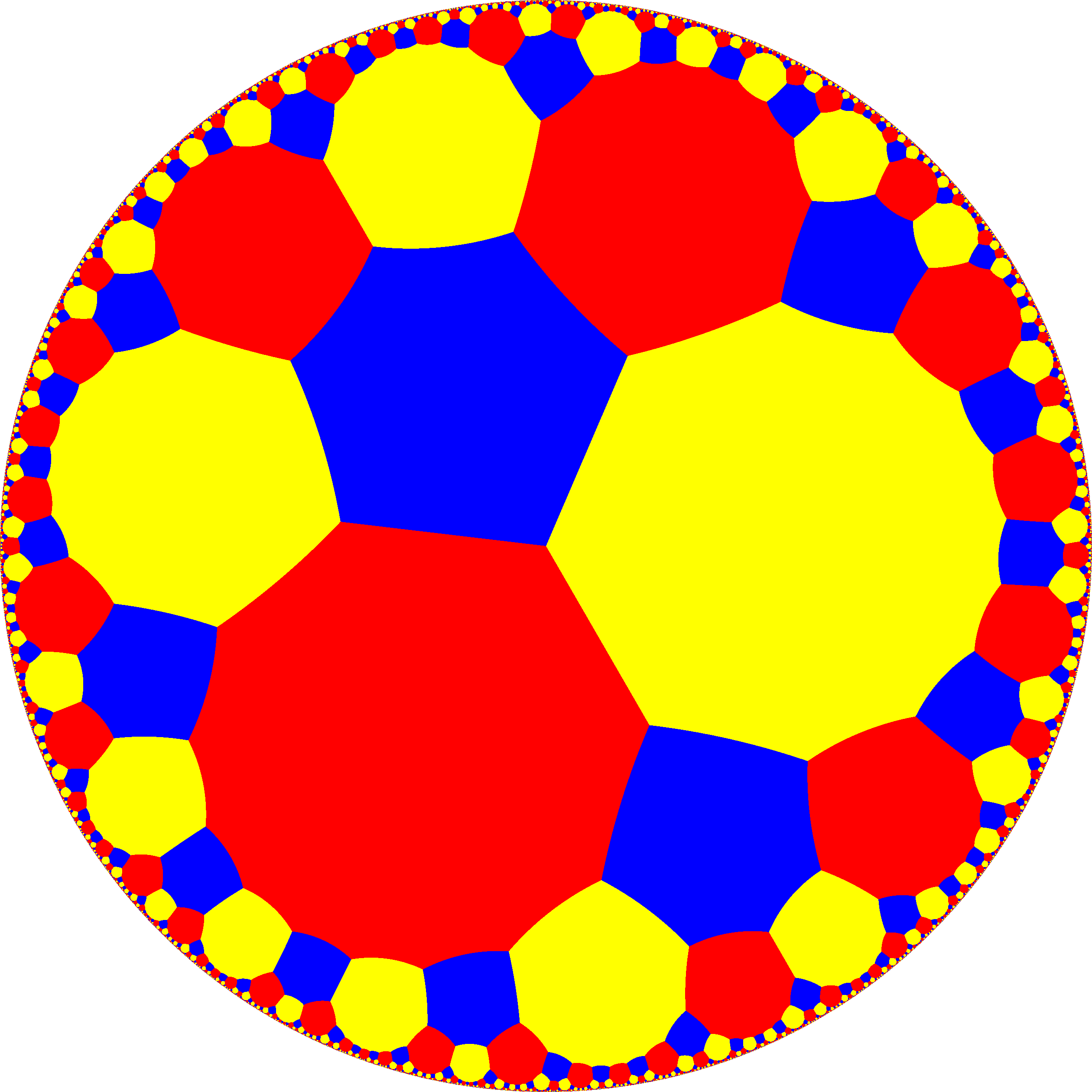

== Symmetry ==
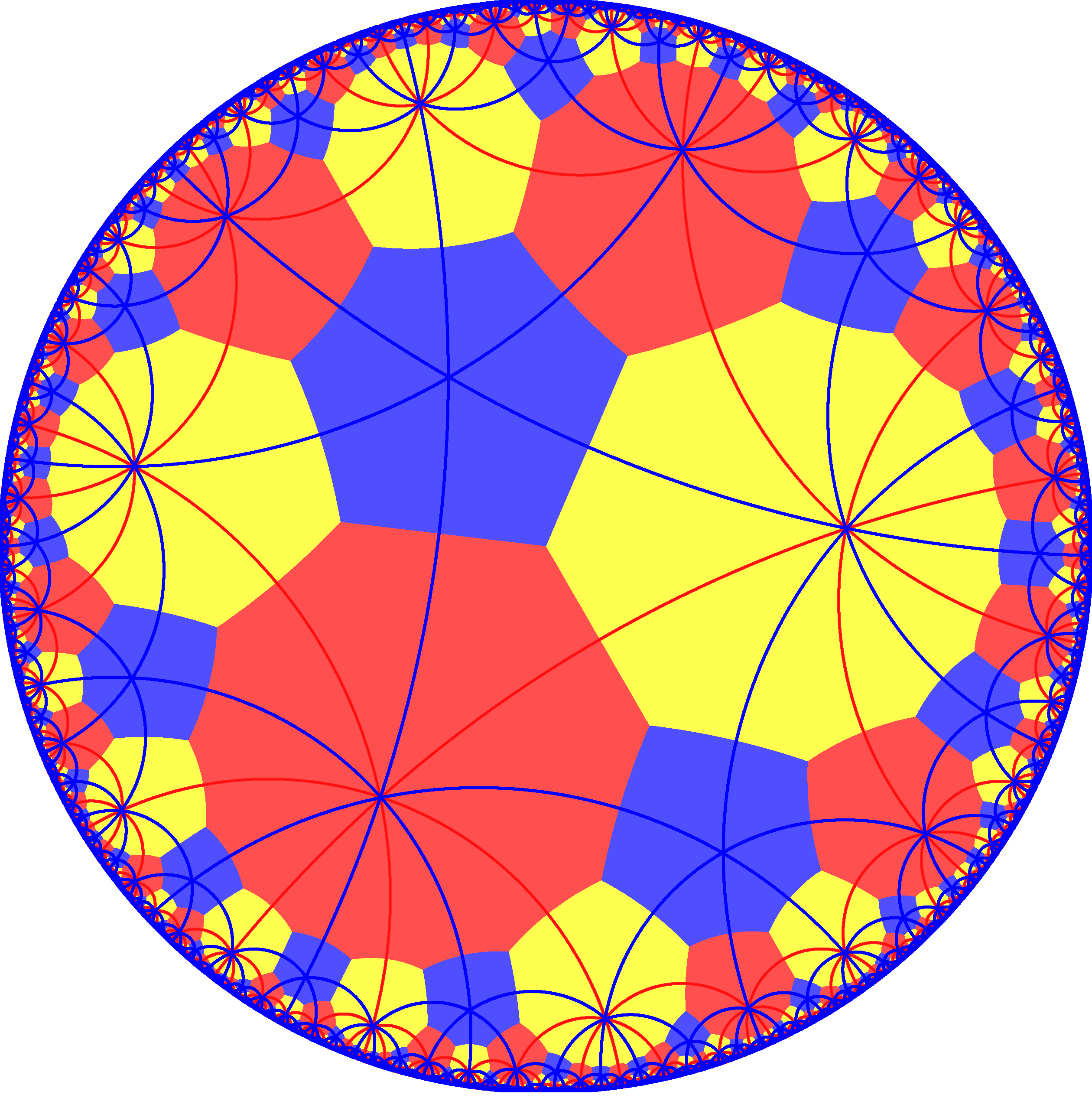
Truncated order-6 hexagonal tiling with *663 mirror lines

The dual to this tiling represent the fundamental domains of [(6,6,3)] (*663) symmetry. There are 3 small index subgroup symmetries constructed from [(6,6,3)] by mirror removal and alternation. In these images fundamental domains are alternately colored black and white, and mirrors exist on the boundaries between colors.

The symmetry can be doubled as 662 symmetry by adding a mirror bisecting the fundamental domain.

Small index subgroups of [(6,6,3)] (*663)
Index	1	2		6
Diagram				
Coxeter (orbifold)	[(6,6,3)] = (*663)	[(6,1^{+},6,3)] = = (*3333)	[(6,6,3^{+})] = (3*33)	[(6,6,3*)] = (*333333)
Direct subgroups
Index	2	4		12
Diagram				
Coxeter (orbifold)	[(6,6,3)]^{+} = (663)	[(6,6,3^{+})]^{+} = = (3333)		[(6,6,3*)]^{+} = (333333)

== Related polyhedra and tiling ==
Uniform hexahexagonal tilings
Symmetry: [6,6], (*662)
= =	= =	= =	= =	= =	= =	= =
{6,6} = h{4,6}	t{6,6} = h_{2}{4,6}	r{6,6} {6,4}	t{6,6} = h_{2}{4,6}	{6,6} = h{4,6}	rr{6,6} r{6,4}	tr{6,6} t{6,4}
Uniform duals
V6^{6}	V6.12.12	V6.6.6.6	V6.12.12	V6^{6}	V4.6.4.6	V4.12.12
Alternations
[1^{+},6,6] (*663)	[6^{+},6] (6*3)	[6,1^{+},6] (*3232)	[6,6^{+}] (6*3)	[6,6,1^{+}] (*663)	[(6,6,2^{+})] (2*33)	[6,6]^{+} (662)
=		=		=		
h{6,6}	s{6,6}	hr{6,6}	s{6,6}	h{6,6}	hrr{6,6}	sr{6,6}

== See also ==
- Square tiling
- Tilings of regular polygons
- List of uniform planar tilings
- List of regular polytopes
