= Octagonal tiling =

Regular tiling of the hyperbolic plane

Octagonal tiling
Poincaré disk model of the hyperbolic plane
Type	Hyperbolic regular tiling
Vertex configuration	8^{3}
Schläfli symbol	{8,3} t{4,8}
Wythoff symbol	3 | 8 2; 2 8 | 4; 4 4 4 |
Coxeter diagram	
Symmetry group	[8,3], (*832) [8,4], (*842) [(4,4,4)], (*444)
Dual	Order-8 triangular tiling
Properties	Vertex-transitive, edge-transitive, face-transitive

In geometry, the octagonal tiling is a regular tiling of the hyperbolic plane. It is represented by Schläfli symbol of {8,3}, having three regular octagons around each vertex. It also has a construction as a truncated order-8 square tiling, t{4,8}.

== Uniform colorings ==
Like the hexagonal tiling of the Euclidean plane, there are 3 uniform colorings of this hyperbolic tiling. The dual tiling V8.8.8 represents the fundamental domains of [(4,4,4)] symmetry.

Regular	Truncations	
{8,3}	t{4,8}	t{4^{[3]}} = =
Dual tiling
{3,8} =	=	= =

== Regular maps ==
The regular map {8,3}_{2,0} can be seen as a 6-coloring of the {8,3} hyperbolic tiling. Within the regular map, octagons of the same color are considered the same face shown in multiple locations. The 2,0 subscripts show the same color will repeat by moving 2 steps in a straight direction following opposite edges. This regular map also has a representation as a double covering of a cube, represented by Schläfli symbol {8/2,3}, with 6 octagonal faces, double wrapped {8/2}, with 24 edges, and 16 vertices. It was described by Branko Grünbaum in his 2003 paper Are Your Polyhedra the Same as My Polyhedra?

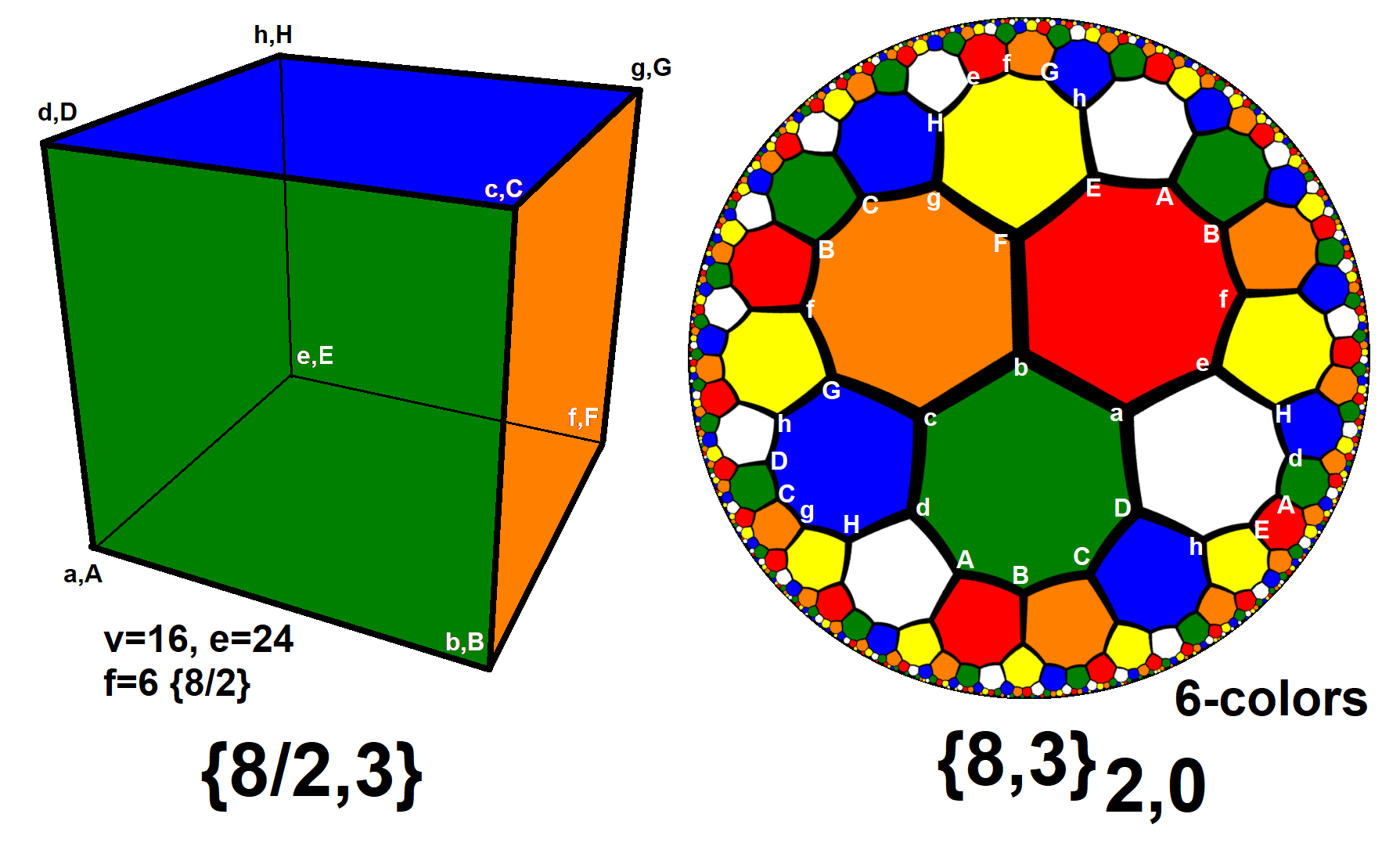

== Related polyhedra and tilings ==
This tiling is topologically part of sequence of regular polyhedra and tilings with Schläfli symbol {n,3}.

*n32 symmetry mutation of regular tilings: {n,3}
Spherical				Euclidean	Compact hyperb.		Paraco.	Noncompact hyperbolic			
{2,3}	{3,3}	{4,3}	{5,3}	{6,3}	{7,3}	{8,3}	{∞,3}	{12i,3}	{9i,3}	{6i,3}	{3i,3}

And also is topologically part of sequence of regular tilings with Schläfli symbol {8,n}.

n82 symmetry mutations of regular tilings: 8^{n}
Space	Spherical	Compact hyperbolic						Paracompact
Tiling								
Config.	8.8	8^{3}	8^{4}	8^{5}	8^{6}	8^{7}	8^{8}	...8^{∞}

From a Wythoff construction there are ten hyperbolic uniform tilings that can be based from the regular octagonal tiling.

Drawing the tiles colored as red on the original faces, yellow at the original vertices, and blue along the original edges, there are 10 forms.

Uniform octagonal/triangular tilings
Symmetry: [8,3], (*832)							[8,3]^{+} (832)	[1^{+},8,3] (*443)		[8,3^{+}] (3*4)
{8,3}	t{8,3}	r{8,3}	t{3,8}	{3,8}	rr{8,3} s_{2}{3,8}	tr{8,3}	sr{8,3}	h{8,3}	h_{2}{8,3}	s{3,8}
								or	or	
Uniform duals
V8^{3}	V3.16.16	V3.8.3.8	V6.6.8	V3^{8}	V3.4.8.4	V4.6.16	V3^{4}.8	V(3.4)^{3}	V8.6.6	V3^{5}.4

Uniform octagonal/square tilings
[8,4], (*842) (with [8,8] (*882), [(4,4,4)] (*444) , [∞,4,∞] (*4222) index 2 subsymmetries) (And [(∞,4,∞,4)] (*4242) index 4 subsymmetry)
= = =	=	= = =	=	= =	=	
{8,4}	t{8,4}	r{8,4}	2t{8,4}=t{4,8}	2r{8,4}={4,8}	rr{8,4}	tr{8,4}
Uniform duals
V8^{4}	V4.16.16	V(4.8)^{2}	V8.8.8	V4^{8}	V4.4.4.8	V4.8.16
Alternations
[1^{+},8,4] (*444)	[8^{+},4] (8*2)	[8,1^{+},4] (*4222)	[8,4^{+}] (4*4)	[8,4,1^{+}] (*882)	[(8,4,2^{+})] (2*42)	[8,4]^{+} (842)
=	=	=	=	=	=	
h{8,4}	s{8,4}	hr{8,4}	s{4,8}	h{4,8}	hrr{8,4}	sr{8,4}
Alternation duals
V(4.4)^{4}	V3.(3.8)^{2}	V(4.4.4)^{2}	V(3.4)^{3}	V8^{8}	V4.4^{4}	V3.3.4.3.8

Uniform (4,4,4) tilings
Symmetry: [(4,4,4)], (*444)							[(4,4,4)]^{+} (444)	[(1^{+},4,4,4)] (*4242)	[(4^{+},4,4)] (4*22)
t_{0}(4,4,4) h{8,4}	t_{0,1}(4,4,4) h_{2}{8,4}	t_{1}(4,4,4) {4,8}^{1}/_{2}	t_{1,2}(4,4,4) h_{2}{8,4}	t_{2}(4,4,4) h{8,4}	t_{0,2}(4,4,4) r{4,8}^{1}/_{2}	t_{0,1,2}(4,4,4) t{4,8}^{1}/_{2}	s(4,4,4) s{4,8}^{1}/_{2}	h(4,4,4) h{4,8}^{1}/_{2}	hr(4,4,4) hr{4,8}^{1}/_{2}
Uniform duals
V(4.4)^{4}	V4.8.4.8	V(4.4)^{4}	V4.8.4.8	V(4.4)^{4}	V4.8.4.8	V8.8.8	V3.4.3.4.3.4	V8^{8}	V(4,4)^{3}

== See also ==
- Tilings of regular polygons
- List of uniform planar tilings
- List of regular polytopes
