= Alternated octagonal tiling =

Uniform tiling of the hyperbolic plane

Alternated octagonal tiling
Poincaré disk model of the hyperbolic plane
Type	Hyperbolic uniform tiling
Vertex configuration	(3.4)^{3}
Schläfli symbol	(4,3,3) s(4,4,4)
Wythoff symbol	3 | 3 4
Coxeter diagram	
Symmetry group	[(4,3,3)], (*433) [(4,4,4)]^{+}, (444)
Dual	Alternated octagonal tiling#Dual tiling
Properties	Vertex-transitive

In geometry, the tritetragonal tiling or alternated octagonal tiling is a uniform tiling of the hyperbolic plane. It has Schläfli symbols of {(4,3,3)} or h{8,3}.

== Geometry ==
Although a sequence of edges seem to represent straight lines (projected into curves), careful attention will show they are not straight, as can be seen by looking at it from different projective centers.

Triangle-centered hyperbolic straight edges	Edge-centered projective straight edges	Point-centered projective straight edges

== Dual tiling ==
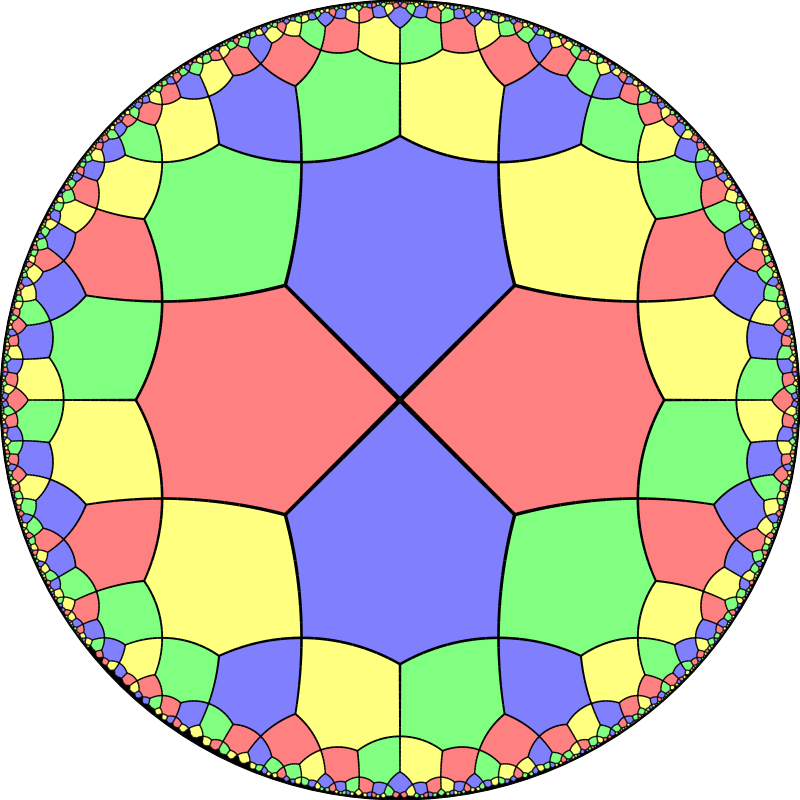

== In art ==
The alternated octagonal tiling, a hyperbolic tiling of squares and equilateral triangles, overlaid on Escher's image

Circle Limit III is a woodcut made in 1959 by Dutch artist M. C. Escher, in which "strings of fish shoot up like rockets from infinitely far away" and then "fall back again whence they came". White curves within the figure, through the middle of each line of fish, divide the plane into squares and triangles in the pattern of the tritetragonal tiling. However, in the tritetragonal tiling, the corresponding curves are chains of hyperbolic line segments, with a slight angle at each vertex, while in Escher's woodcut they appear to be smooth hypercycles.

== Related polyhedra and tiling ==
Uniform (4,3,3) tilings
Symmetry: [(4,3,3)], (*433)							[(4,3,3)]^{+}, (433)
h{8,3} t_{0}(4,3,3)	r{3,8}^{1}/_{2} t_{0,1}(4,3,3)	h{8,3} t_{1}(4,3,3)	h_{2}{8,3} t_{1,2}(4,3,3)	{3,8}^{1}/_{2} t_{2}(4,3,3)	h_{2}{8,3} t_{0,2}(4,3,3)	t{3,8}^{1}/_{2} t_{0,1,2}(4,3,3)	s{3,8}^{1}/_{2} s(4,3,3)
Uniform duals
V(3.4)^{3}	V3.8.3.8	V(3.4)^{3}	V3.6.4.6	V(3.3)^{4}	V3.6.4.6	V6.6.8	V3.3.3.3.3.4

Uniform (4,4,4) tilings
Symmetry: [(4,4,4)], (*444)							[(4,4,4)]^{+} (444)	[(1^{+},4,4,4)] (*4242)	[(4^{+},4,4)] (4*22)
t_{0}(4,4,4) h{8,4}	t_{0,1}(4,4,4) h_{2}{8,4}	t_{1}(4,4,4) {4,8}^{1}/_{2}	t_{1,2}(4,4,4) h_{2}{8,4}	t_{2}(4,4,4) h{8,4}	t_{0,2}(4,4,4) r{4,8}^{1}/_{2}	t_{0,1,2}(4,4,4) t{4,8}^{1}/_{2}	s(4,4,4) s{4,8}^{1}/_{2}	h(4,4,4) h{4,8}^{1}/_{2}	hr(4,4,4) hr{4,8}^{1}/_{2}
Uniform duals
V(4.4)^{4}	V4.8.4.8	V(4.4)^{4}	V4.8.4.8	V(4.4)^{4}	V4.8.4.8	V8.8.8	V3.4.3.4.3.4	V8^{8}	V(4,4)^{3}

== See also ==
- Circle Limit III
- Square tiling
- Uniform tilings in hyperbolic plane
- List of regular polytopes
