= Cantic octagonal tiling =

Concept in mathematics

Cantic octagonal tiling
Poincaré disk model of the hyperbolic plane
Type	Hyperbolic uniform tiling
Vertex configuration	3.6.4.6
Schläfli symbol	h_{2}{8,3}
Wythoff symbol	4 3 | 3
Coxeter diagram	=
Symmetry group	[(4,3,3)], (*433)
Dual	Order-4-3-3 t12 dual tiling
Properties	Vertex-transitive

In geometry, the tritetratrigonal tiling or shieldotritetragonal tiling is a uniform tiling of the hyperbolic plane. It has Schläfli symbol of t_{1,2}(4,3,3). It can also be named as a cantic octagonal tiling, h_{2}{8,3}.

== Dual tiling ==
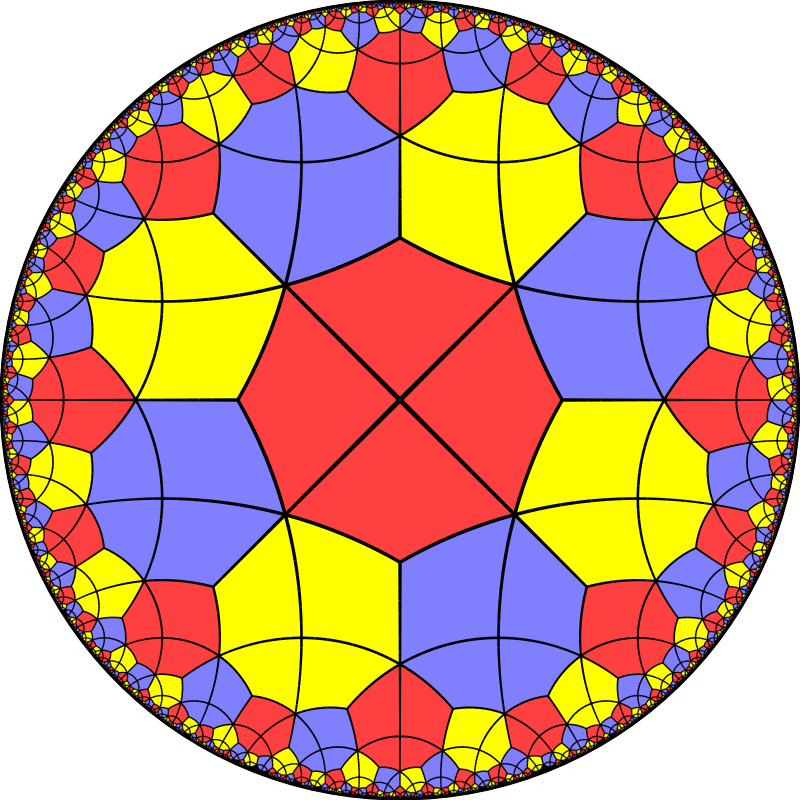

== Related polyhedra and tiling ==
Uniform (4,3,3) tilings
Symmetry: [(4,3,3)], (*433)							[(4,3,3)]^{+}, (433)
h{8,3} t_{0}(4,3,3)	r{3,8}^{1}/_{2} t_{0,1}(4,3,3)	h{8,3} t_{1}(4,3,3)	h_{2}{8,3} t_{1,2}(4,3,3)	{3,8}^{1}/_{2} t_{2}(4,3,3)	h_{2}{8,3} t_{0,2}(4,3,3)	t{3,8}^{1}/_{2} t_{0,1,2}(4,3,3)	s{3,8}^{1}/_{2} s(4,3,3)
Uniform duals
V(3.4)^{3}	V3.8.3.8	V(3.4)^{3}	V3.6.4.6	V(3.3)^{4}	V3.6.4.6	V6.6.8	V3.3.3.3.3.4

*n33 orbifold symmetries of cantic tilings: 3.6.n.6
Symmetry *n32 [1^{+},2n,3] = [(n,3,3)]	Spherical	Euclidean	Compact Hyperbolic			Paracompact
Symmetry *n32 [1^{+},2n,3] = [(n,3,3)]	*233 [1^{+},4,3] = [3,3]	*333 [1^{+},6,3] = [(3,3,3)]	*433 [1^{+},8,3] = [(4,3,3)]	*533 [1^{+},10,3] = [(5,3,3)]	*633... [1^{+},12,3] = [(6,3,3)]	*∞33 [1^{+},∞,3] = [(∞,3,3)]
Coxeter Schläfli	= h_{2}{4,3}	= h_{2}{6,3}	= h_{2}{8,3}	= h_{2}{10,3}	= h_{2}{12,3}	= h_{2}{∞,3}
Cantic figure						
Vertex	3.6.2.6	3.6.3.6	3.6.4.6	3.6.5.6	3.6.6.6	3.6.∞.6
Domain						
Wythoff	2 3 | 3	3 3 | 3	4 3 | 3	5 3 | 3	6 3 | 3	∞ 3 | 3
Dual figure						
Face	V3.6.2.6	V3.6.3.6	V3.6.4.6	V3.6.5.6	V3.6.6.6	V3.6.∞.6

== See also ==
- Square tiling
- Uniform tilings in hyperbolic plane
- List of regular polytopes
