= Uniform tilings in hyperbolic plane =

Symmetric subdivision in hyperbolic geometry

Examples of uniform tilings
Spherical	Euclidean	Hyperbolic	
{5,3} 5.5.5	{6,3} 6.6.6	{7,3} 7.7.7	{∞,3} ∞.∞.∞
Regular tilings {p,q} of the sphere, Euclidean plane, and hyperbolic plane using regular pentagonal, hexagonal and heptagonal and apeirogonal faces.
t{5,3} 10.10.3	t{6,3} 12.12.3	t{7,3} 14.14.3	t{∞,3} ∞.∞.3
Truncated tilings have 2p.2p.q vertex figures from regular {p,q}.
r{5,3} 3.5.3.5	r{6,3} 3.6.3.6	r{7,3} 3.7.3.7	r{∞,3} 3.∞.3.∞
Quasiregular tilings are similar to regular tilings but alternate two types of regular polygon around each vertex.
rr{5,3} 3.4.5.4	rr{6,3} 3.4.6.4	rr{7,3} 3.4.7.4	rr{∞,3} 3.4.∞.4
Semiregular tilings have more than one type of regular polygon.
tr{5,3} 4.6.10	tr{6,3} 4.6.12	tr{7,3} 4.6.14	tr{∞,3} 4.6.∞
Omnitruncated tilings have three or more even-sided regular polygons.

In hyperbolic geometry, a uniform hyperbolic tiling (or regular, quasiregular or semiregular hyperbolic tiling) is an edge-to-edge filling of the hyperbolic plane which has regular polygons as faces and is vertex-transitive (transitive on its vertices, isogonal, i.e. there is an isometry mapping any vertex onto any other). It follows that all vertices are congruent, and the tiling has a high degree of rotational and translational symmetry.

Uniform tilings can be identified by their vertex configuration, a sequence of numbers representing the number of sides of the polygons around each vertex. For example, 7.7.7 represents the heptagonal tiling which has 3 heptagons around each vertex. It is also regular since all the polygons are the same size, so it can also be given the Schläfli symbol {7,3}.

Uniform tilings may be regular (if also face- and edge-transitive), quasi-regular (if edge-transitive but not face-transitive) or semi-regular (if neither edge- nor face-transitive). For right triangles (p q 2), there are two regular tilings, represented by Schläfli symbol {p,q} and {q,p}.

Construction of Archimedean Solids and Tessellations
Symmetry		Triangular dihedral symmetry		Tetrahedral	Octahedral		Icosahedral		p6m symmetry		[3,7] symmetry		[3,8] symmetry	
Starting solid Operation	Symbol {p,q}	Triangular hosohedron {2,3}	Triangular dihedron {3,2}	Tetrahedron {3,3}	Cube {4,3}	Octahedron {3,4}	Dodecahedron {5,3}	Icosahedron {3,5}	Hexagonal tiling {6,3}	Triangular tiling {3,6}	Heptagonal tiling {7,3}	Order-7 triangular tiling {3,7}	Octagonal tiling {8,3}	Order-8 triangular tiling {3,8}
Truncation (t)	t{p,q}	triangular prism	truncated triangular dihedron (Half of the "edges" count as degenerate digon faces. The other half are normal edges.)	truncated tetrahedron	truncated cube	truncated octahedron	truncated dodecahedron	truncated icosahedron	Truncated hexagonal tiling	Truncated triangular tiling	Truncated heptagonal tiling	Truncated order-7 triangular tiling	Truncated octagonal tiling	Truncated order-8 triangular tiling
Rectification (r) Ambo (a)	r{p,q}	tridihedron (All of the "edges" count as degenerate digon faces.)		tetratetrahedron	cuboctahedron		icosidodecahedron		Trihexagonal tiling		Triheptagonal tiling		Trioctagonal tiling	
Bitruncation (2t) Dual kis (dk)	2t{p,q}	truncated triangular dihedron (Half of the "edges" count as degenerate digon faces. The other half are normal edges.)	triangular prism	truncated tetrahedron	truncated octahedron	truncated cube	truncated icosahedron	truncated dodecahedron	truncated triangular tiling	truncated hexagonal tiling	Truncated order-7 triangular tiling	Truncated heptagonal tiling	Truncated order-8 triangular tiling	Truncated octagonal tiling
Birectification (2r) Dual (d)	2r{p,q}	triangular dihedron {3,2}	triangular hosohedron {2,3}	tetrahedron	octahedron	cube	icosahedron	dodecahedron	triangular tiling	hexagonal tiling	Order-7 triangular tiling	Heptagonal tiling	Order-8 triangular tiling	Octagonal tiling
Cantellation (rr) Expansion (e)	rr{p,q}	triangular prism (The "edge" between each pair of tetragons counts as a degenerate digon face. The other edges (the ones between a trigon and a tetragon) are normal edges.)		rhombitetratetrahedron	rhombicuboctahedron		rhombicosidodecahedron		rhombitrihexagonal tiling		Rhombitriheptagonal tiling		Rhombitrioctagonal tiling	
Snub rectified (sr) Snub (s)	sr{p,q}	triangular antiprism (Three yellow-yellow "edges", no two of which share any vertices, count as degenerate digon faces. The other edges are normal edges.)		snub tetratetrahedron	snub cuboctahedron		snub icosidodecahedron		snub trihexagonal tiling		Snub triheptagonal tiling		Snub trioctagonal tiling	
Cantitruncation (tr) Bevel (b)	tr{p,q}	hexagonal prism		truncated tetratetrahedron	truncated cuboctahedron		truncated icosidodecahedron		truncated trihexagonal tiling		Truncated triheptagonal tiling		Truncated trioctagonal tiling	

== Wythoff construction ==
Example of Wythoff construction with right triangles (r = 2) and the 7 generator points. Lines to the active mirrors are colored red, yellow, and blue with the 3 nodes opposite them as associated by the Wythoff symbol.

There are an infinite number of uniform tilings based on the Schwarz triangles (p q r) where 1/p + 1/q + 1/r < 1, where p, q, r are each orders of reflection symmetry at three points of the fundamental domain triangle – the symmetry group is a hyperbolic triangle group.

Each symmetry family contains 7 uniform tilings, defined by a Wythoff symbol or Coxeter-Dynkin diagram, 7 representing combinations of 3 active mirrors. An 8th represents an alternation operation, deleting alternate vertices from the highest form with all mirrors active.

Families with r = 2 contain regular hyperbolic tilings, defined by a Coxeter group such as [7,3], [8,3], [9,3], ... [5,4], [6,4], ....

Hyperbolic families with r = 3 or higher are given by (p q r) and include (4 3 3), (5 3 3), (6 3 3) ... (4 4 3), (5 4 3), ... (4 4 4)....

Hyperbolic triangles (p q r) define compact uniform hyperbolic tilings. In the limit any of p, q or r can be replaced by ∞ which defines a paracompact hyperbolic triangle and creates uniform tilings with either infinite faces (called apeirogons) that converge to a single ideal point, or infinite vertex figure with infinitely many edges diverging from the same ideal point.

More symmetry families can be constructed from fundamental domains that are not triangles.

Selected families of uniform tilings are shown below (using the Poincaré disk model for the hyperbolic plane). Three of them – (7 3 2), (5 4 2), and (4 3 3) – and no others, are minimal in the sense that if any of their defining numbers is replaced by a smaller integer the resulting pattern is either Euclidean or spherical rather than hyperbolic; conversely, any of the numbers can be increased (even to infinity) to generate other hyperbolic patterns.

Each uniform tiling generates a dual uniform tiling, with many of them also given below.

== Right triangle domains ==
There are infinitely many (p q 2) triangle group families. This article shows the regular tiling up to p, q = 8, and uniform tilings in 12 families: (7 3 2), (8 3 2), (5 4 2), (6 4 2), (7 4 2), (8 4 2), (5 5 2), (6 5 2) (6 6 2), (7 7 2), (8 6 2), and (8 8 2).

=== Regular hyperbolic tilings ===
The simplest set of hyperbolic tilings are regular tilings {p,q}, which exist in a matrix with the regular polyhedra and Euclidean tilings. The regular tiling {p,q} has a dual tiling {q,p} across the diagonal axis of the table. Self-dual tilings {2,2}, {3,3}, {4,4}, {5,5}, etc. pass down the diagonal of the table.

Regular hyperbolic tiling table
Spherical (improper/Platonic)/Euclidean/hyperbolic (Poincaré disk: compact/paracompact/noncompact) tessellations with their Schläfli symbol
p \ q	2	3	4	5	6	7	8	...	∞	...	iπ/λ
2	{2,2}	{2,3}	{2,4}	{2,5}	{2,6}	{2,7}	{2,8}	...	{2,∞}	...	{2,iπ/λ}
3	{3,2}	(tetrahedron) {3,3}	(octahedron) {3,4}	(icosahedron) {3,5}	(deltille) {3,6}	{3,7}	{3,8}	...	{3,∞}	...	{3,iπ/λ}
4	{4,2}	(cube) {4,3}	(quadrille) {4,4}	{4,5}	{4,6}	{4,7}	{4,8}	...	{4,∞}	...	{4,iπ/λ}
5	{5,2}	(dodecahedron) {5,3}	{5,4}	{5,5}	{5,6}	{5,7}	{5,8}	...	{5,∞}	...	{5,iπ/λ}
6	{6,2}	(hextille) {6,3}	{6,4}	{6,5}	{6,6}	{6,7}	{6,8}	...	{6,∞}	...	{6,iπ/λ}
7	{7,2}	{7,3}	{7,4}	{7,5}	{7,6}	{7,7}	{7,8}	...	{7,∞}	...	{7,iπ/λ}
8	{8,2}	{8,3}	{8,4}	{8,5}	{8,6}	{8,7}	{8,8}	...	{8,∞}	...	{8,iπ/λ}
...								...		...	
∞	{∞,2}	{∞,3}	{∞,4}	{∞,5}	{∞,6}	{∞,7}	{∞,8}	...	{∞,∞}	...	{∞,iπ/λ}
...								...		...	
iπ/λ	{iπ/λ,2}	{iπ/λ,3}	{iπ/λ,4}	{iπ/λ,5}	{iπ/λ,6}	{iπ/λ,7}	{iπ/λ,8}	...	{iπ/λ,∞}	...	{iπ/λ, iπ/λ}

=== (7 3 2) ===
The (7 3 2) triangle group, Coxeter group [7,3], orbifold (*732) contains these uniform tilings:

Uniform heptagonal/triangular tilings
Symmetry: [7,3], (*732)							[7,3]^{+}, (732)
{7,3}	t{7,3}	r{7,3}	t{3,7}	{3,7}	rr{7,3}	tr{7,3}	sr{7,3}
Uniform duals
V7^{3}	V3.14.14	V3.7.3.7	V6.6.7	V3^{7}	V3.4.7.4	V4.6.14	V3.3.3.3.7

=== (8 3 2) ===
The (8 3 2) triangle group, Coxeter group [8,3], orbifold (*832) contains these uniform tilings:

Uniform octagonal/triangular tilings
Symmetry: [8,3], (*832)							[8,3]^{+} (832)	[1^{+},8,3] (*443)		[8,3^{+}] (3*4)
{8,3}	t{8,3}	r{8,3}	t{3,8}	{3,8}	rr{8,3} s_{2}{3,8}	tr{8,3}	sr{8,3}	h{8,3}	h_{2}{8,3}	s{3,8}
								or	or	
Uniform duals
V8^{3}	V3.16.16	V3.8.3.8	V6.6.8	V3^{8}	V3.4.8.4	V4.6.16	V3^{4}.8	V(3.4)^{3}	V8.6.6	V3^{5}.4

=== (5 4 2) ===
The (5 4 2) triangle group, Coxeter group [5,4], orbifold (*542) contains these uniform tilings:

Uniform pentagonal/square tilings
Symmetry: [5,4], (*542)							[5,4]^{+}, (542)	[5^{+},4], (5*2)	[5,4,1^{+}], (*552)
{5,4}	t{5,4}	r{5,4}	2t{5,4}=t{4,5}	2r{5,4}={4,5}	rr{5,4}	tr{5,4}	sr{5,4}	s{5,4}	h{4,5}
Uniform duals
V5^{4}	V4.10.10	V4.5.4.5	V5.8.8	V4^{5}	V4.4.5.4	V4.8.10	V3.3.4.3.5	V3.3.5.3.5	V5^{5}

=== (6 4 2) ===
The (6 4 2) triangle group, Coxeter group [6,4], orbifold (*642) contains these uniform tilings. Because all the elements are even, each uniform dual tiling one represents the fundamental domain of a reflective symmetry: *3333, *662, *3232, *443, *222222, *3222, and *642 respectively. As well, all 7 uniform tiling can be alternated, and those have duals as well.

Uniform tetrahexagonal tilings
Symmetry: [6,4], (*642) (with [6,6] (*662), [(4,3,3)] (*443) , [∞,3,∞] (*3222) index 2 subsymmetries) (And [(∞,3,∞,3)] (*3232) index 4 subsymmetry)
= = =	=	= = =	=	= = =	=	
{6,4}	t{6,4}	r{6,4}	t{4,6}	{4,6}	rr{6,4}	tr{6,4}
Uniform duals
V6^{4}	V4.12.12	V(4.6)^{2}	V6.8.8	V4^{6}	V4.4.4.6	V4.8.12
Alternations
[1^{+},6,4] (*443)	[6^{+},4] (6*2)	[6,1^{+},4] (*3222)	[6,4^{+}] (4*3)	[6,4,1^{+}] (*662)	[(6,4,2^{+})] (2*32)	[6,4]^{+} (642)
=	=	=	=	=	=	
h{6,4}	s{6,4}	hr{6,4}	s{4,6}	h{4,6}	hrr{6,4}	sr{6,4}

=== (7 4 2) ===
The (7 4 2) triangle group, Coxeter group [7,4], orbifold (*742) contains these uniform tilings:

Uniform heptagonal/square tilings
Symmetry: [7,4], (*742)							[7,4]^{+}, (742)	[7^{+},4], (7*2)	[7,4,1^{+}], (*772)
{7,4}	t{7,4}	r{7,4}	2t{7,4}=t{4,7}	2r{7,4}={4,7}	rr{7,4}	tr{7,4}	sr{7,4}	s{7,4}	h{4,7}
Uniform duals
V7^{4}	V4.14.14	V4.7.4.7	V7.8.8	V4^{7}	V4.4.7.4	V4.8.14	V3.3.4.3.7	V3.3.7.3.7	V7^{7}

=== (8 4 2) ===
The (8 4 2) triangle group, Coxeter group [8,4], orbifold (*842) contains these uniform tilings. Because all the elements are even, each uniform dual tiling one represents the fundamental domain of a reflective symmetry: *4444, *882, *4242, *444, *22222222, *4222, and *842 respectively. As well, all 7 uniform tiling can be alternated, and those have duals as well.

Uniform octagonal/square tilings
[8,4], (*842) (with [8,8] (*882), [(4,4,4)] (*444) , [∞,4,∞] (*4222) index 2 subsymmetries) (And [(∞,4,∞,4)] (*4242) index 4 subsymmetry)
= = =	=	= = =	=	= =	=	
{8,4}	t{8,4}	r{8,4}	2t{8,4}=t{4,8}	2r{8,4}={4,8}	rr{8,4}	tr{8,4}
Uniform duals
V8^{4}	V4.16.16	V(4.8)^{2}	V8.8.8	V4^{8}	V4.4.4.8	V4.8.16
Alternations
[1^{+},8,4] (*444)	[8^{+},4] (8*2)	[8,1^{+},4] (*4222)	[8,4^{+}] (4*4)	[8,4,1^{+}] (*882)	[(8,4,2^{+})] (2*42)	[8,4]^{+} (842)
=	=	=	=	=	=	
h{8,4}	s{8,4}	hr{8,4}	s{4,8}	h{4,8}	hrr{8,4}	sr{8,4}
Alternation duals
V(4.4)^{4}	V3.(3.8)^{2}	V(4.4.4)^{2}	V(3.4)^{3}	V8^{8}	V4.4^{4}	V3.3.4.3.8

=== (5 5 2) ===
The (5 5 2) triangle group, Coxeter group [5,5], orbifold (*552) contains these uniform tilings:

Uniform pentapentagonal tilings
Symmetry: [5,5], (*552)							[5,5]^{+}, (552)
=	=	=	=	=	=	=	=
Order-5 pentagonal tiling {5,5}	Truncated order-5 pentagonal tiling t{5,5}	Order-4 pentagonal tiling r{5,5}	Truncated order-5 pentagonal tiling 2t{5,5} = t{5,5}	Order-5 pentagonal tiling 2r{5,5} = {5,5}	Tetrapentagonal tiling rr{5,5}	Truncated order-4 pentagonal tiling tr{5,5}	Snub pentapentagonal tiling sr{5,5}
Uniform duals
Order-5 pentagonal tiling V5.5.5.5.5	V5.10.10	Order-5 square tiling V5.5.5.5	V5.10.10	Order-5 pentagonal tiling V5.5.5.5.5	V4.5.4.5	V4.10.10	V3.3.5.3.5

=== (6 5 2) ===
The (6 5 2) triangle group, Coxeter group [6,5], orbifold (*652) contains these uniform tilings:

Uniform hexagonal/pentagonal tilings
Symmetry: [6,5], (*652)							[6,5]^{+}, (652)	[6,5^{+}], (5*3)	[1^{+},6,5], (*553)
{6,5}	t{6,5}	r{6,5}	2t{6,5}=t{5,6}	2r{6,5}={5,6}	rr{6,5}	tr{6,5}	sr{6,5}	s{5,6}	h{6,5}
Uniform duals
V6^{5}	V5.12.12	V5.6.5.6	V6.10.10	V5^{6}	V4.5.4.6	V4.10.12	V3.3.5.3.6	V3.3.3.5.3.5	V(3.5)^{5}

=== (6 6 2) ===
The (6 6 2) triangle group, Coxeter group [6,6], orbifold (*662) contains these uniform tilings:

Uniform hexahexagonal tilings
Symmetry: [6,6], (*662)
= =	= =	= =	= =	= =	= =	= =
{6,6} = h{4,6}	t{6,6} = h_{2}{4,6}	r{6,6} {6,4}	t{6,6} = h_{2}{4,6}	{6,6} = h{4,6}	rr{6,6} r{6,4}	tr{6,6} t{6,4}
Uniform duals
V6^{6}	V6.12.12	V6.6.6.6	V6.12.12	V6^{6}	V4.6.4.6	V4.12.12
Alternations
[1^{+},6,6] (*663)	[6^{+},6] (6*3)	[6,1^{+},6] (*3232)	[6,6^{+}] (6*3)	[6,6,1^{+}] (*663)	[(6,6,2^{+})] (2*33)	[6,6]^{+} (662)
=		=		=		
h{6,6}	s{6,6}	hr{6,6}	s{6,6}	h{6,6}	hrr{6,6}	sr{6,6}

=== (8 6 2) ===
The (8 6 2) triangle group, Coxeter group [8,6], orbifold (*862) contains these uniform tilings.

Uniform octagonal/hexagonal tilings
Symmetry: [8,6], (*862)
{8,6}	t{8,6}	r{8,6}	2t{8,6}=t{6,8}	2r{8,6}={6,8}	rr{8,6}	tr{8,6}
Uniform duals
V8^{6}	V6.16.16	V(6.8)^{2}	V8.12.12	V6^{8}	V4.6.4.8	V4.12.16
Alternations
[1^{+},8,6] (*466)	[8^{+},6] (8*3)	[8,1^{+},6] (*4232)	[8,6^{+}] (6*4)	[8,6,1^{+}] (*883)	[(8,6,2^{+})] (2*43)	[8,6]^{+} (862)
h{8,6}	s{8,6}	hr{8,6}	s{6,8}	h{6,8}	hrr{8,6}	sr{8,6}
Alternation duals
V(4.6)^{6}	V3.3.8.3.8.3	V(3.4.4.4)^{2}	V3.4.3.4.3.6	V(3.8)^{8}	V3.4^{5}	V3.3.6.3.8

=== (7 7 2) ===
The (7 7 2) triangle group, Coxeter group [7,7], orbifold (*772) contains these uniform tilings:

Uniform heptaheptagonal tilings
Symmetry: [7,7], (*772)							[7,7]^{+}, (772)
= =	= =	= =	= =	= =	= =	= =	= =
{7,7}	t{7,7}	r{7,7}	2t{7,7}=t{7,7}	2r{7,7}={7,7}	rr{7,7}	tr{7,7}	sr{7,7}
Uniform duals
V7^{7}	V7.14.14	V7.7.7.7	V7.14.14	V7^{7}	V4.7.4.7	V4.14.14	V3.3.7.3.7

=== (8 8 2) ===
The (8 8 2) triangle group, Coxeter group [8,8], orbifold (*882) contains these uniform tilings:

Uniform octaoctagonal tilings
Symmetry: [8,8], (*882)
= =	= =	= =	= =	= =	= =	= =
{8,8}	t{8,8}	r{8,8}	2t{8,8}=t{8,8}	2r{8,8}={8,8}	rr{8,8}	tr{8,8}
Uniform duals
V8^{8}	V8.16.16	V8.8.8.8	V8.16.16	V8^{8}	V4.8.4.8	V4.16.16
Alternations
[1^{+},8,8] (*884)	[8^{+},8] (8*4)	[8,1^{+},8] (*4242)	[8,8^{+}] (8*4)	[8,8,1^{+}] (*884)	[(8,8,2^{+})] (2*44)	[8,8]^{+} (882)
=		=		=	= =	= =
h{8,8}	s{8,8}	hr{8,8}	s{8,8}	h{8,8}	hrr{8,8}	sr{8,8}
Alternation duals
V(4.8)^{8}	V3.4.3.8.3.8	V(4.4)^{4}	V3.4.3.8.3.8	V(4.8)^{8}	V4^{6}	V3.3.8.3.8

== General triangle domains ==
There are infinitely many general triangle group families (p q r). This article shows uniform tilings in 9 families: (4 3 3), (4 4 3), (4 4 4), (5 3 3), (5 4 3), (5 4 4), (6 3 3), (6 4 3), and (6 4 4).

=== (4 3 3) ===
The (4 3 3) triangle group, Coxeter group [(4,3,3)], orbifold (*433) contains these uniform tilings. Without right angles in the fundamental triangle, the Wythoff constructions are slightly different. For instance in the (4,3,3) triangle family, the snub form has six polygons around a vertex and its dual has hexagons rather than pentagons. In general the vertex figure of a snub tiling in a triangle (p,q,r) is p. 3.q.3.r.3, being 4.3.3.3.3.3 in this case below.

Uniform (4,3,3) tilings
Symmetry: [(4,3,3)], (*433)							[(4,3,3)]^{+}, (433)
h{8,3} t_{0}(4,3,3)	r{3,8}^{1}/_{2} t_{0,1}(4,3,3)	h{8,3} t_{1}(4,3,3)	h_{2}{8,3} t_{1,2}(4,3,3)	{3,8}^{1}/_{2} t_{2}(4,3,3)	h_{2}{8,3} t_{0,2}(4,3,3)	t{3,8}^{1}/_{2} t_{0,1,2}(4,3,3)	s{3,8}^{1}/_{2} s(4,3,3)
Uniform duals
V(3.4)^{3}	V3.8.3.8	V(3.4)^{3}	V3.6.4.6	V(3.3)^{4}	V3.6.4.6	V6.6.8	V3.3.3.3.3.4

=== (4 4 3) ===
The (4 4 3) triangle group, Coxeter group [(4,4,3)], orbifold (*443) contains these uniform tilings.

Uniform (4,4,3) tilings
Symmetry: [(4,4,3)] (*443)							[(4,4,3)]^{+} (443)	[(4,4,3^{+})] (3*22)	[(4,1^{+},4,3)] (*3232)	
h{6,4} t_{0}(4,4,3)	h_{2}{6,4} t_{0,1}(4,4,3)	{4,6}^{1}/_{2} t_{1}(4,4,3)	h_{2}{6,4} t_{1,2}(4,4,3)	h{6,4} t_{2}(4,4,3)	r{6,4}^{1}/_{2} t_{0,2}(4,4,3)	t{4,6}^{1}/_{2} t_{0,1,2}(4,4,3)	s{4,6}^{1}/_{2} s(4,4,3)	hr{4,6}^{1}/_{2} hr(4,3,4)	h{4,6}^{1}/_{2} h(4,3,4)	q{4,6} h_{1}(4,3,4)
Uniform duals
V(3.4)^{4}	V3.8.4.8	V(4.4)^{3}	V3.8.4.8	V(3.4)^{4}	V4.6.4.6	V6.8.8	V3.3.3.4.3.4	V(4.4.3)^{2}	V6^{6}	V4.3.4.6.6

=== (4 4 4) ===
The (4 4 4) triangle group, Coxeter group [(4,4,4)], orbifold (*444) contains these uniform tilings.

Uniform (4,4,4) tilings
Symmetry: [(4,4,4)], (*444)							[(4,4,4)]^{+} (444)	[(1^{+},4,4,4)] (*4242)	[(4^{+},4,4)] (4*22)
t_{0}(4,4,4) h{8,4}	t_{0,1}(4,4,4) h_{2}{8,4}	t_{1}(4,4,4) {4,8}^{1}/_{2}	t_{1,2}(4,4,4) h_{2}{8,4}	t_{2}(4,4,4) h{8,4}	t_{0,2}(4,4,4) r{4,8}^{1}/_{2}	t_{0,1,2}(4,4,4) t{4,8}^{1}/_{2}	s(4,4,4) s{4,8}^{1}/_{2}	h(4,4,4) h{4,8}^{1}/_{2}	hr(4,4,4) hr{4,8}^{1}/_{2}
Uniform duals
V(4.4)^{4}	V4.8.4.8	V(4.4)^{4}	V4.8.4.8	V(4.4)^{4}	V4.8.4.8	V8.8.8	V3.4.3.4.3.4	V8^{8}	V(4,4)^{3}

=== (5 3 3) ===
The (5 3 3) triangle group, Coxeter group [(5,3,3)], orbifold (*533) contains these uniform tilings.

Uniform (5,3,3) tilings
Symmetry: [(5,3,3)], (*533)							[(5,3,3)]^{+}, (533)
h{10,3} t_{0}(5,3,3)	r{3,10}^{1}/_{2} t_{0,1}(5,3,3)	h{10,3} t_{1}(5,3,3)	h_{2}{10,3} t_{1,2}(5,3,3)	{3,10}^{1}/_{2} t_{2}(5,3,3)	h_{2}{10,3} t_{0,2}(5,3,3)	t{3,10}^{1}/_{2} t_{0,1,2}(5,3,3)	s{3,10}^{1}/_{2} ht_{0,1,2}(5,3,3)
Uniform duals
V(3.5)^{3}	V3.10.3.10	V(3.5)^{3}	V3.6.5.6	V(3.3)^{5}	V3.6.5.6	V6.6.10	V3.3.3.3.3.5

=== (5 4 3) ===
The (5 4 3) triangle group, Coxeter group [(5,4,3)], orbifold (*543) contains these uniform tilings.

(5,4,3) uniform tilings
Symmetry: [(5,4,3)], (*543)							[(5,4,3)]^{+}, (543)
t_{0}(5,4,3) (5,4,3)	t_{0,1}(5,4,3) r(3,5,4)	t_{1}(5,4,3) (4,3,5)	t_{1,2}(5,4,3) r(5,4,3)	t_{2}(5,4,3) (3,5,4)	t_{0,2}(5,4,3) r(4,3,5)	t_{0,1,2}(5,4,3) t(5,4,3)	s(5,4,3)
Uniform duals
V(3.5)^{4}	V3.10.4.10	V(4.5)^{3}	V3.8.5.8	V(3.4)^{5}	V4.6.5.6	V6.8.10	V3.5.3.4.3.3

=== (5 4 4) ===
The (5 4 4) triangle group, Coxeter group [(5,4,4)], orbifold (*544) contains these uniform tilings.

Uniform (5,4,4) tilings
Symmetry: [(5,4,4)] (*544)							[(5,4,4)]^{+} (544)	[(5^{+},4,4)] (5*22)	[(5,4,1^{+},4)] (*5222)
t_{0}(5,4,4) h{10,4}	t_{0,1}(5,4,4) r{4,10}^{1}/_{2}	t_{1}(5,4,4) h{10,4}	t_{1,2}(5,4,4) h_{2}{10,4}	t_{2}(5,4,4) {4,10}^{1}/_{2}	t_{0,2}(5,4,4) h_{2}{10,4}	t_{0,1,2}(5,4,4) t{4,10}^{1}/_{2}	s(4,5,4) s{4,10}^{1}/_{2}	h(4,5,4) h{4,10}^{1}/_{2}	hr(4,5,4) hr{4,10}^{1}/_{2}
Uniform duals
V(4.5)^{4}	V4.10.4.10	V(4.5)^{4}	V4.8.5.8	V(4.4)^{5}	V4.8.5.8	V8.8.10	V3.4.3.4.3.5	V10^{10}	V(4.4.5)^{2}

=== (6 3 3) ===
The (6 3 3) triangle group, Coxeter group [(6,3,3)], orbifold (*633) contains these uniform tilings.

Uniform (6,3,3) tilings
Symmetry: [(6,3,3)], (*633)							[(6,3,3)]^{+}, (633)
t_{0}{(6,3,3)} h{12,3}	t_{0,1}{(6,3,3)} r{3,12}^{1}/_{2}	t_{1}{(6,3,3)} h{12,3}	t_{1,2}{(6,3,3)} h_{2}{12,3}	t_{2}{(6,3,3)} {3,12}^{1}/_{2}	t_{0,2}{(6,3,3)} h_{2}{12,3}	t_{0,1,2}{(6,3,3)} t{3,12}^{1}/_{2}	s{(6,3,3)} s{3,12}^{1}/_{2}
Uniform duals
V(3.6)^{3}	V3.12.3.12	V(3.6)^{3}	V3.6.6.6	V(3.3)^{6} {12,3}	V3.6.6.6	V6.6.12	V3.3.3.3.3.6

=== (6 4 3) ===
The (6 4 3) triangle group, Coxeter group [(6,4,3)], orbifold (*643) contains these uniform tilings.

(6,4,3) uniform tilings
Symmetry: [(6,4,3)] (*643)							[(6,4,3)]^{+} (643)	[(6,1^{+},4,3)] (*3332)	[(6,4,3^{+})] (3*32)
								=	
t_{0}{(6,4,3)}	t_{0,1}{(6,4,3)}	t_{1}{(6,4,3)}	t_{1,2}{(6,4,3)}	t_{2}{(6,4,3)}	t_{0,2}{(6,4,3)}	t_{0,1,2}{(6,4,3)}	s{(6,4,3)}	h{(6,4,3)}	hr{(6,4,3)}
Uniform duals
V(3.6)^{4}	V3.12.4.12	V(4.6)^{3}	V3.8.6.8	V(3.4)^{6}	V4.6.6.6	V6.8.12	V3.6.3.4.3.3	V(3.6.6)^{3}	V4.(3.4)^{3}

=== (6 4 4) ===
The (6 4 4) triangle group, Coxeter group [(6,4,4)], orbifold (*644) contains these uniform tilings.

6-4-4 uniform tilings
Symmetry: [(6,4,4)], (*644)							(644)
(6,4,4) h{12,4}	t_{0,1}(6,4,4) r{4,12}^{1}/_{2}	t_{1}(6,4,4) h{12,4}	t_{1,2}(6,4,4) h_{2}{12,4}	t_{2}(6,4,4) {4,12}^{1}/_{2}	t_{0,2}(6,4,4) h_{2}{12,4}	t_{0,1,2}(6,4,4) t{4,12}^{1}/_{2}	s(6,4,4) s{4,12}^{1}/_{2}
Uniform duals
V(4.6)^{4}	V(4.12)^{2}	V(4.6)^{4}	V4.8.6.8	V4^{12}	V4.8.6.8	V8.8.12	V4.3.4.3.6.3

== Summary of tilings with finite triangular fundamental domains ==
Reference: Template:Finite triangular hyperbolic tilings table

== Quadrilateral domains ==
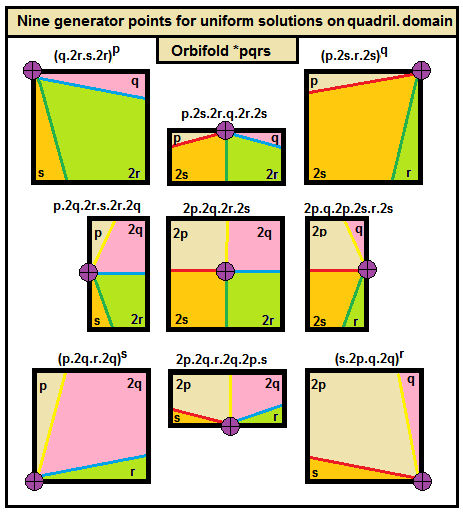
A quadrilateral domain has 9 generator point positions that define uniform tilings. Vertex figures are listed for general orbifold symmetry *pqrs, with 2-gonal faces degenerating into edges.

=== (3 2 2 2) ===
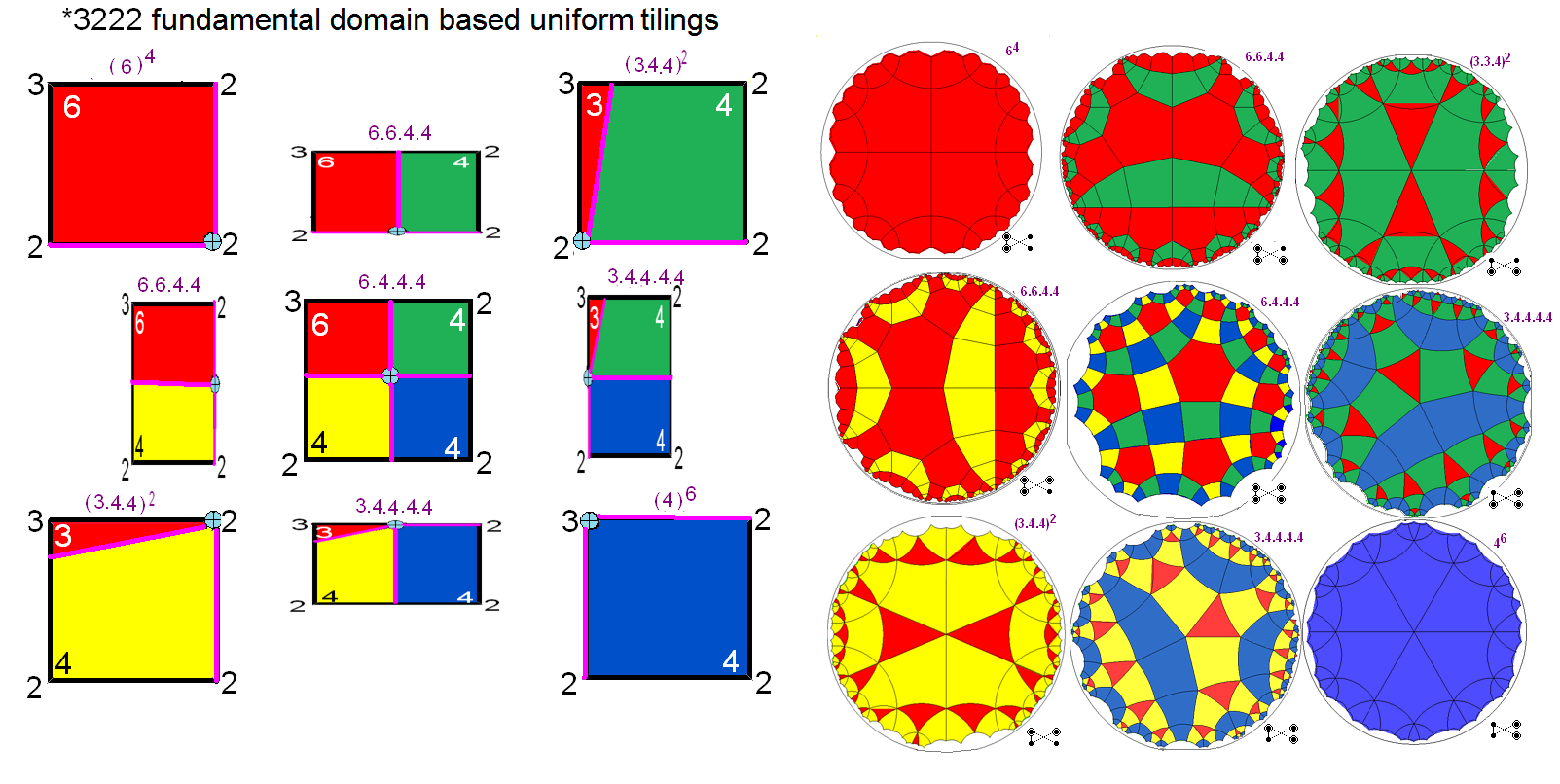
Example uniform tilings of *3222 symmetry

Quadrilateral fundamental domains also exist in the hyperbolic plane, with the *3222 orbifold ([∞,3,∞] Coxeter notation) as the smallest family. There are 9 generation locations for uniform tiling within quadrilateral domains. The vertex figure can be extracted from a fundamental domain as 3 cases (1) Corner (2) Mid-edge, and (3) Center. When generating points are corners adjacent to order-2 corners, degenerate {2} digon faces at those corners exist but can be ignored. Snub and alternated uniform tilings can also be generated (not shown) if a vertex figure contains only even-sided faces.

Coxeter diagrams of quadrilateral domains are treated as a degenerate tetrahedron graph with 2 of 6 edges labeled as infinity, or as dotted lines. A logical requirement of at least one of two parallel mirrors being active limits the uniform cases to 9, and other ringed patterns are not valid.

Uniform tilings in symmetry *3222
6^{4}	6.6.4.4	(3.4.4)^{2}	4.3.4.3.3.3
6.6.4.4	6.4.4.4	3.4.4.4.4	
(3.4.4)^{2}	3.4.4.4.4	4^{6}	

=== (3 2 3 2) ===
Similar H2 tilings in *3232 symmetry
Coxeter diagrams				
Vertex figure	6^{6}	(3.4.3.4)^{2}	3.4.6.6.4	6.4.6.4
Image				
Dual				

== Ideal triangle domains ==
There are infinitely many triangle group families including infinite orders. This article shows uniform tilings in 9 families: (∞ 3 2), (∞ 4 2), (∞ ∞ 2), (∞ 3 3), (∞ 4 3), (∞ 4 4), (∞ ∞ 3), (∞ ∞ 4), and (∞ ∞ ∞).

=== (∞ 3 2) ===
The ideal (∞ 3 2) triangle group, Coxeter group [∞,3], orbifold (*∞32) contains these uniform tilings:

Paracompact uniform tilings in [∞,3] family
Symmetry: [∞,3], (*∞32)							[∞,3]^{+} (∞32)	[1^{+},∞,3] (*∞33)		[∞,3^{+}] (3*∞)
		=	=	=				= or	= or	=
{∞,3}	t{∞,3}	r{∞,3}	t{3,∞}	{3,∞}	rr{∞,3}	tr{∞,3}	sr{∞,3}	h{∞,3}	h_{2}{∞,3}	s{3,∞}
Uniform duals
V∞^{3}	V3.∞.∞	V(3.∞)^{2}	V6.6.∞	V3^{∞}	V4.3.4.∞	V4.6.∞	V3.3.3.3.∞	V(3.∞)^{3}		V3.3.3.3.3.∞

=== (∞ 4 2) ===
The ideal (∞ 4 2) triangle group, Coxeter group [∞,4], orbifold (*∞42) contains these uniform tilings:

Paracompact uniform tilings in [∞,4] family
{∞,4}	t{∞,4}	r{∞,4}	2t{∞,4}=t{4,∞}	2r{∞,4}={4,∞}	rr{∞,4}	tr{∞,4}
Dual figures
V∞^{4}	V4.∞.∞	V(4.∞)^{2}	V8.8.∞	V4^{∞}	V4^{3}.∞	V4.8.∞
Alternations
[1^{+},∞,4] (*44∞)	[∞^{+},4] (∞*2)	[∞,1^{+},4] (*2∞2∞)	[∞,4^{+}] (4*∞)	[∞,4,1^{+}] (*∞∞2)	[(∞,4,2^{+})] (2*2∞)	[∞,4]^{+} (∞42)
=				=		
h{∞,4}	s{∞,4}	hr{∞,4}	s{4,∞}	h{4,∞}	hrr{∞,4}	s{∞,4}
Alternation duals
V(∞.4)^{4}	V3.(3.∞)^{2}	V(4.∞.4)^{2}	V3.∞.(3.4)^{2}	V∞^{∞}	V∞.4^{4}	V3.3.4.3.∞

=== (∞ 5 2) ===
The ideal (∞ 5 2) triangle group, Coxeter group [∞,5], orbifold (*∞52) contains these uniform tilings:

Paracompact uniform apeirogonal/pentagonal tilings
Symmetry: [∞,5], (*∞52)							[∞,5]^{+} (∞52)	[1^{+},∞,5] (*∞55)		[∞,5^{+}] (5*∞)
{∞,5}	t{∞,5}	r{∞,5}	2t{∞,5}=t{5,∞}	2r{∞,5}={5,∞}	rr{∞,5}	tr{∞,5}	sr{∞,5}	h{∞,5}	h_{2}{∞,5}	s{5,∞}
Uniform duals
V∞^{5}	V5.∞.∞	V5.∞.5.∞	V∞.10.10	V5^{∞}	V4.5.4.∞	V4.10.∞	V3.3.5.3.∞		V(∞.5)^{5}	V3.5.3.5.3.∞

=== (∞ ∞ 2) ===
The ideal (∞ ∞ 2) triangle group, Coxeter group [∞,∞], orbifold (*∞∞2) contains these uniform tilings:

Paracompact uniform tilings in [∞,∞] family
= =	= =	= =	= =	= =	=	=
{∞,∞}	t{∞,∞}	r{∞,∞}	2t{∞,∞}=t{∞,∞}	2r{∞,∞}={∞,∞}	rr{∞,∞}	tr{∞,∞}
Dual tilings
V∞^{∞}	V∞.∞.∞	V(∞.∞)^{2}	V∞.∞.∞	V∞^{∞}	V4.∞.4.∞	V4.4.∞
Alternations
[1^{+},∞,∞] (*∞∞2)	[∞^{+},∞] (∞*∞)	[∞,1^{+},∞] (*∞∞∞∞)	[∞,∞^{+}] (∞*∞)	[∞,∞,1^{+}] (*∞∞2)	[(∞,∞,2^{+})] (2*∞∞)	[∞,∞]^{+} (2∞∞)
h{∞,∞}	s{∞,∞}	hr{∞,∞}	s{∞,∞}	h_{2}{∞,∞}	hrr{∞,∞}	sr{∞,∞}
Alternation duals
V(∞.∞)^{∞}	V(3.∞)^{3}	V(∞.4)^{4}	V(3.∞)^{3}	V∞^{∞}	V(4.∞.4)^{2}	V3.3.∞.3.∞

=== (∞ 3 3) ===
The ideal (∞ 3 3) triangle group, Coxeter group [(∞,3,3)], orbifold (*∞33) contains these uniform tilings.

Paracompact hyperbolic uniform tilings in [(∞,3,3)] family
Symmetry: [(∞,3,3)], (*∞33)							[(∞,3,3)]^{+}, (∞33)
(∞,∞,3)	t_{0,1}(∞,3,3)	t_{1}(∞,3,3)	t_{1,2}(∞,3,3)	t_{2}(∞,3,3)	t_{0,2}(∞,3,3)	t_{0,1,2}(∞,3,3)	s(∞,3,3)
Dual tilings
V(3.∞)^{3}	V3.∞.3.∞	V(3.∞)^{3}	V3.6.∞.6	V(3.3)^{∞}	V3.6.∞.6	V6.6.∞	V3.3.3.3.3.∞

=== (∞ 4 3) ===
The ideal (∞ 4 3) triangle group, Coxeter group [(∞,4,3)], orbifold (*∞43) contains these uniform tilings:

Paracompact hyperbolic uniform tilings in [(∞,4,3)] family
Symmetry: [(∞,4,3)] (*∞43)							[(∞,4,3)]^{+} (∞43)	[(∞,4,3^{+})] (3*4∞)	[(∞,1^{+},4,3)] (*∞323)
									=
(∞,4,3)	t_{0,1}(∞,4,3)	t_{1}(∞,4,3)	t_{1,2}(∞,4,3)	t_{2}(∞,4,3)	t_{0,2}(∞,4,3)	t_{0,1,2}(∞,4,3)	s(∞,4,3)	ht_{0,2}(∞,4,3)	ht_{1}(∞,4,3)
Dual tilings
V(3.∞)^{4}	V3.∞.4.∞	V(4.∞)^{3}	V3.8.∞.8	V(3.4)^{∞}	4.6.∞.6	V6.8.∞	V3.3.3.4.3.∞	V(4.3.4)^{2}.∞	V(6.∞.6)^{3}

=== (∞ 4 4) ===
The ideal (∞ 4 4) triangle group, Coxeter group [(∞,4,4)], orbifold (*∞44) contains these uniform tilings.

Paracompact hyperbolic uniform tilings in [(4,4,∞)] family
Symmetry: [(4,4,∞)], (*44∞)							(44∞)
(4,4,∞) h{∞,4}	t_{0,1}(4,4,∞) r{4,∞}^{1}/_{2}	t_{1}(4,4,∞) h{4,∞}^{1}/_{2}	t_{1,2}(4,4,∞) h_{2}{∞,4}	t_{2}(4,4,∞) {4,∞}^{1}/_{2}	t_{0,2}(4,4,∞) h_{2}{∞,4}	t_{0,1,2}(4,4,∞) t{4,∞}^{1}/_{2}	s(4,4,∞) s{4,∞}^{1}/_{2}
Dual tilings
V(4.∞)^{4}	V4.∞.4.∞	V(4.∞)^{4}	V4.8.∞.8;	V4^{∞}	V4.8.∞.8;	V8.8.∞	V3.4.3.4.3.∞

=== (∞ ∞ 3) ===
The ideal (∞ ∞ 3) triangle group, Coxeter group [(∞,∞,3)], orbifold (*∞∞3) contains these uniform tilings.

Paracompact hyperbolic uniform tilings in [(∞,∞,3)] family
Symmetry: [(∞,∞,3)], (*∞∞3)							[(∞,∞,3)]^{+} (∞∞3)	[(∞,∞,3^{+})] (3*∞∞)	[(∞,1^{+},∞,3)] (*∞3∞3)
									=
(∞,∞,3) h{6,∞}	t_{0,1}(∞,∞,3) h_{2}{6,∞}	t_{1}(∞,∞,3) {∞,6}^{1}/_{2}	t_{1,2}(∞,∞,3) h_{2}{6,∞}	t_{2}(∞,∞,3) h{6,∞}	t_{0,2}(∞,∞,3) r{∞,6}^{1}/_{2}	t_{0,1,2}(∞,∞,3) t{∞,6}^{1}/_{2}	s(∞,∞,3) s{∞,6}^{1}/_{2}	hr_{0,2}(∞,∞,3) hr{∞,6}^{1}/_{2}	hr_{1}(∞,∞,3) h{∞,6}^{1}/_{2}
Dual tilings
V(3.∞)^{∞}	V3.∞.∞.∞	V(∞.∞)^{3}	V3.∞.∞.∞	V(3.∞)^{∞}	V(6.∞)^{2}	V6.∞.∞	V3.∞.3.∞.3.3	V(3.4.∞.4)^{2}	V(∞.6)^{6}

=== (∞ ∞ 4) ===
The ideal (∞ ∞ 4) triangle group, Coxeter group [(∞,∞,4)], orbifold (*∞∞4) contains these uniform tilings.

Paracompact hyperbolic uniform tilings in [(∞,∞,4)] family
Symmetry: [(∞,∞,4)], (*∞∞4)
(∞,∞,4) h{8,∞}	t_{0,1}(∞,∞,4) h_{2}{8,∞}	t_{1}(∞,∞,4) {∞,8}	t_{1,2}(∞,∞,4) h_{2}{∞,8}	t_{2}(∞,∞,4) h{8,∞}	t_{0,2}(∞,∞,4) r{∞,8}	t_{0,1,2}(∞,∞,4) t{∞,8}
Dual tilings
V(4.∞)^{∞}	V∞.∞.∞.4	V∞^{4}	V∞.∞.∞.4	V(4.∞)^{∞}	V∞.∞.∞.4	V∞.∞.8
Alternations
[(1^{+},∞,∞,4)] (*2∞∞∞)	[(∞^{+},∞,4)] (∞*2∞)	[(∞,1^{+},∞,4)] (*2∞∞∞)	[(∞,∞^{+},4)] (∞*2∞)	[(∞,∞,1^{+},4)] (*2∞∞∞)	[(∞,∞,4^{+})] (2*∞∞)	[(∞,∞,4)]^{+} (4∞∞)
Alternation duals
V∞^{∞}	V∞.4^{4}	V(∞.4)^{4}	V∞.4^{4}	V∞^{∞}	V∞.4^{4}	V3.∞.3.∞.3.4

=== (∞ ∞ ∞) ===
The ideal (∞ ∞ ∞) triangle group, Coxeter group [(∞,∞,∞)], orbifold (*∞∞∞) contains these uniform tilings.

Paracompact uniform tilings in [(∞,∞,∞)] family
(∞,∞,∞) h{∞,∞}	r(∞,∞,∞) h_{2}{∞,∞}	(∞,∞,∞) h{∞,∞}	r(∞,∞,∞) h_{2}{∞,∞}	(∞,∞,∞) h{∞,∞}	r(∞,∞,∞) r{∞,∞}	t(∞,∞,∞) t{∞,∞}
Dual tilings
V∞^{∞}	V∞.∞.∞.∞	V∞^{∞}	V∞.∞.∞.∞	V∞^{∞}	V∞.∞.∞.∞	V∞.∞.∞
Alternations
[(1^{+},∞,∞,∞)] (*∞∞∞∞)	[∞^{+},∞,∞)] (∞*∞)	[∞,1^{+},∞,∞)] (*∞∞∞∞)	[∞,∞^{+},∞)] (∞*∞)	[(∞,∞,∞,1^{+})] (*∞∞∞∞)	[(∞,∞,∞^{+})] (∞*∞)	[∞,∞,∞)]^{+} (∞∞∞)
Alternation duals
V(∞.∞)^{∞}	V(∞.4)^{4}	V(∞.∞)^{∞}	V(∞.4)^{4}	V(∞.∞)^{∞}	V(∞.4)^{4}	V3.∞.3.∞.3.∞

== Summary of tilings with infinite triangular fundamental domains ==
For a table of all uniform hyperbolic tilings with fundamental domains (p q r), where 2 ≤ p,q,r ≤ 8, and one or more as ∞.

Infinite triangular hyperbolic tilings
(p q r)	t0	h0	t01	h01	t1	h1	t12	h12	t2	h2	t02	h02	t012	s
(∞ 3 2)	t_{0}{∞,3} ∞^{3}	h_{0}{∞,3} (3.∞)^{3}	t_{01}{∞,3} ∞.3.∞		t_{1}{∞,3} (3.∞)^{2}		t_{12}{∞,3} 6.∞.6	h_{12}{∞,3} 3.3.3.∞.3.3	t_{2}{∞,3} 3^{∞}		t_{02}{∞,3} 3.4.∞.4		t_{012}{∞,3} 4.6.∞	s{∞,3} 3.3.3.3.∞
(∞ 4 2)	t_{0}{∞,4} ∞^{4}	h_{0}{∞,4} (4.∞)^{4}	t_{01}{∞,4} ∞.4.∞	h_{01}{∞,4} 3.∞.3.3.∞	t_{1}{∞,4} (4.∞)^{2}	h_{1}{∞,4} (4.4.∞)^{2}	t_{12}{∞,4} 8.∞.8	h_{12}{∞,4} 3.4.3.∞.3.4	t_{2}{∞,4} 4^{∞}	h_{2}{∞,4} ∞^{∞}	t_{02}{∞,4} 4.4.∞.4	h_{02}{∞,4} 4.4.4.∞.4	t_{012}{∞,4} 4.8.∞	s{∞,4} 3.3.4.3.∞
(∞ 5 2)	t_{0}{∞,5} ∞^{5}	h_{0}{∞,5} (5.∞)^{5}	t_{01}{∞,5} ∞.5.∞		t_{1}{∞,5} (5.∞)^{2}		t_{12}{∞,5} 10.∞.10	h_{12}{∞,5} 3.5.3.∞.3.5	t_{2}{∞,5} 5^{∞}		t_{02}{∞,5} 5.4.∞.4		t_{012}{∞,5} 4.10.∞	s{∞,5} 3.3.5.3.∞
(∞ 6 2)	t_{0}{∞,6} ∞^{6}	h_{0}{∞,6} (6.∞)^{6}	t_{01}{∞,6} ∞.6.∞	h_{01}{∞,6} 3.∞.3.3.3.∞	t_{1}{∞,6} (6.∞)^{2}	h_{1}{∞,6} (4.3.4.∞)^{2}	t_{12}{∞,6} 12.∞.12	h_{12}{∞,6} 3.6.3.∞.3.6	t_{2}{∞,6} 6^{∞}	h_{2}{∞,6} (∞.3)^{∞}	t_{02}{∞,6} 6.4.∞.4	h_{02}{∞,6} 4.3.4.4.∞.4	t_{012}{∞,6} 4.12.∞	s{∞,6} 3.3.6.3.∞
(∞ 7 2)	t_{0}{∞,7} ∞^{7}	h_{0}{∞,7} (7.∞)^{7}	t_{01}{∞,7} ∞.7.∞		t_{1}{∞,7} (7.∞)^{2}		t_{12}{∞,7} 14.∞.14	h_{12}{∞,7} 3.7.3.∞.3.7	t_{2}{∞,7} 7^{∞}		t_{02}{∞,7} 7.4.∞.4		t_{012}{∞,7} 4.14.∞	s{∞,7} 3.3.7.3.∞
(∞ 8 2)	t_{0}{∞,8} ∞^{8}	h_{0}{∞,8} (8.∞)^{8}	t_{01}{∞,8} ∞.8.∞	h_{01}{∞,8} 3.∞.3.4.3.∞	t_{1}{∞,8} (8.∞)^{2}	h_{1}{∞,8} (4.4.4.∞)^{2}	t_{12}{∞,8} 16.∞.16	h_{12}{∞,8} 3.8.3.∞.3.8	t_{2}{∞,8} 8^{∞}	h_{2}{∞,8} (∞.4)^{∞}	t_{02}{∞,8} 8.4.∞.4	h_{02}{∞,8} 4.4.4.4.∞.4	t_{012}{∞,8} 4.16.∞	s{∞,8} 3.3.8.3.∞
(∞ ∞ 2)	t_{0}{∞,∞} ∞^{∞}	h_{0}{∞,∞} (∞.∞)^{∞}	t_{01}{∞,∞} ∞.∞.∞	h_{01}{∞,∞} 3.∞.3.∞.3.∞	t_{1}{∞,∞} ∞^{4}	h_{1}{∞,∞} (4.∞)^{4}	t_{12}{∞,∞} ∞.∞.∞	h_{12}{∞,∞} 3.∞.3.∞.3.∞	t_{2}{∞,∞} ∞^{∞}	h_{2}{∞,∞} (∞.∞)^{∞}	t_{02}{∞,∞} (∞.4)^{2}	h_{02}{∞,∞} (4.∞.4)^{2}	t_{012}{∞,∞} 4.∞.∞	s{∞,∞} 3.3.∞.3.∞
(∞ 3 3)	t_{0}(∞,3,3) (∞.3)^{3}		t_{01}(∞,3,3) (3.∞)^{2}		t_{1}(∞,3,3) (3.∞)^{3}		t_{12}(∞,3,3) 3.6.∞.6		t_{2}(∞,3,3) 3^{∞}		t_{02}(∞,3,3) 3.6.∞.6		t_{012}(∞,3,3) 6.6.∞	s(∞,3,3); 3.3.3.3.3.∞
(∞ 4 3)	t_{0}(∞,4,3) (∞.3)^{4}		t_{01}(∞,4,3) 3.∞.4.∞		t_{1}(∞,4,3) (4.∞)^{3}	h_{1}(∞,4,3) (6.6.∞)^{3}	t_{12}(∞,4,3) 3.8.∞.8		t_{2}(∞,4,3) (4.3)^{∞}		t_{02}(∞,4,3) 4.6.∞.6	h_{02}(∞,4,3); 4.4.3.4.∞.4.3	t_{012}(∞,4,3) 6.8.∞	s(∞,4,3); 3.3.3.4.3.∞
(∞ 5 3)	t_{0}(∞,5,3) (∞.3)^{5}		t_{01}(∞,5,3) 3.∞.5.∞		t_{1}(∞,5,3) (5.∞)^{3}		t_{12}(∞,5,3) 3.10.∞.10		t_{2}(∞,5,3) (5.3)^{∞}		t_{02}(∞,5,3) 5.6.∞.6		t_{012}(∞,5,3) 6.10.∞	s(∞,5,3); 3.3.3.5.3.∞
(∞ 6 3)	t_{0}(∞,6,3) (∞.3)^{6}		t_{01}(∞,6,3) 3.∞.6.∞		t_{1}(∞,6,3) (6.∞)^{3}	h_{1}(∞,6,3) (6.3.6.∞)^{3}	t_{12}(∞,6,3) 3.12.∞.12		t_{2}(∞,6,3) (6.3)^{∞}		t_{02}(∞,6,3) 6.6.∞.6	h_{02}(∞,6,3); 4.3.4.3.4.∞.4.3	t_{012}(∞,6,3) 6.12.∞	s(∞,6,3); 3.3.3.6.3.∞
(∞ 7 3)	t_{0}(∞,7,3) (∞.3)^{7}		t_{01}(∞,7,3) 3.∞.7.∞		t_{1}(∞,7,3) (7.∞)^{3}		t_{12}(∞,7,3) 3.14.∞.14		t_{2}(∞,7,3) (7.3)^{∞}		t_{02}(∞,7,3) 7.6.∞.6		t_{012}(∞,7,3) 6.14.∞	s(∞,7,3); 3.3.3.7.3.∞
(∞ 8 3)	t_{0}(∞,8,3) (∞.3)^{8}		t_{01}(∞,8,3) 3.∞.8.∞		t_{1}(∞,8,3) (8.∞)^{3}	h_{1}(∞,8,3) (6.4.6.∞)^{3}	t_{12}(∞,8,3) 3.16.∞.16		t_{2}(∞,8,3) (8.3)^{∞}		t_{02}(∞,8,3) 8.6.∞.6	h_{02}(∞,8,3); 4.4.4.3.4.∞.4.3	t_{012}(∞,8,3) 6.16.∞	s(∞,8,3); 3.3.3.8.3.∞
(∞ ∞ 3)	t_{0}(∞,∞,3) (∞.3)^{∞}		t_{01}(∞,∞,3) 3.∞.∞.∞		t_{1}(∞,∞,3) ∞^{6}	h_{1}(∞,∞,3) (6.∞)^{6}	t_{12}(∞,∞,3) 3.∞.∞.∞		t_{2}(∞,∞,3) (∞.3)^{∞}		t_{02}(∞,∞,3) (∞.6)^{2}	h_{02}(∞,∞,3) (4.∞.4.3)^{2}	t_{012}(∞,∞,3) 6.∞.∞	s(∞,∞,3); 3.3.3.∞.3.∞
(∞ 4 4)	t_{0}(∞,4,4) (∞.4)^{4}	h_{0}(∞,4,4) (8.∞.8)^{4}	t_{01}(∞,4,4) (4.∞)^{2}	h_{01}(∞,4,4) (4.4.∞)^{2}	t_{1}(∞,4,4) (4.∞)^{4}	h_{1}(∞,4,4) (8.8.∞)^{4}	t_{12}(∞,4,4) 4.8.∞.8	h_{12}(∞,4,4); 4.4.4.4.∞.4.4	t_{2}(∞,4,4) 4^{∞}	h_{2}(∞,4,4) ∞^{∞}	t_{02}(∞,4,4) 4.8.∞.8	h_{02}(∞,4,4); 4.4.4.4.∞.4.4	t_{012}(∞,4,4) 8.8.∞	s(∞,4,4); 3.4.3.4.3.∞
(∞ 5 4)	t_{0}(∞,5,4) (∞.4)^{5}	h_{0}(∞,5,4) (10.∞.10)^{5}	t_{01}(∞,5,4) 4.∞.5.∞		t_{1}(∞,5,4) (5.∞)^{4}		t_{12}(∞,5,4) 4.10.∞.10	h_{12}(∞,5,4); 4.4.5.4.∞.4.5	t_{2}(∞,5,4) (5.4)^{∞}		t_{02}(∞,5,4) 5.8.∞.8		t_{012}(∞,5,4) 8.10.∞	s(∞,5,4); 3.4.3.5.3.∞
(∞ 6 4)	t_{0}(∞,6,4) (∞.4)^{6}	h_{0}(∞,6,4) (12.∞.12)^{6}	t_{01}(∞,6,4) 4.∞.6.∞	h_{01}(∞,6,4); 4.4.∞.4.3.4.∞	t_{1}(∞,6,4) (6.∞)^{4}	h_{1}(∞,6,4) (8.3.8.∞)^{4}	t_{12}(∞,6,4) 4.12.∞.12	h_{12}(∞,6,4); 4.4.6.4.∞.4.6	t_{2}(∞,6,4) (6.4)^{∞}	h_{2}(∞,6,4) (∞.3.∞)^{∞}	t_{02}(∞,6,4) 6.8.∞.8	h_{02}(∞,6,4); 4.3.4.4.4.∞.4.4	t_{012}(∞,6,4) 8.12.∞	s(∞,6,4); 3.4.3.6.3.∞
(∞ 7 4)	t_{0}(∞,7,4) (∞.4)^{7}	h_{0}(∞,7,4) (14.∞.14)^{7}	t_{01}(∞,7,4) 4.∞.7.∞		t_{1}(∞,7,4) (7.∞)^{4}		t_{12}(∞,7,4) 4.14.∞.14	h_{12}(∞,7,4); 4.4.7.4.∞.4.7	t_{2}(∞,7,4) (7.4)^{∞}		t_{02}(∞,7,4) 7.8.∞.8		t_{012}(∞,7,4) 8.14.∞	s(∞,7,4); 3.4.3.7.3.∞
(∞ 8 4)	t_{0}(∞,8,4) (∞.4)^{8}	h_{0}(∞,8,4) (16.∞.16)^{8}	t_{01}(∞,8,4) 4.∞.8.∞	h_{01}(∞,8,4); 4.4.∞.4.4.4.∞	t_{1}(∞,8,4) (8.∞)^{4}	h_{1}(∞,8,4) (8.4.8.∞)^{4}	t_{12}(∞,8,4) 4.16.∞.16	h_{12}(∞,8,4); 4.4.8.4.∞.4.8	t_{2}(∞,8,4) (8.4)^{∞}	h_{2}(∞,8,4) (∞.4.∞)^{∞}	t_{02}(∞,8,4) 8.8.∞.8	h_{02}(∞,8,4); 4.4.4.4.4.∞.4.4	t_{012}(∞,8,4) 8.16.∞	s(∞,8,4); 3.4.3.8.3.∞
(∞ ∞ 4)	t_{0}(∞,∞,4) (∞.4)^{∞}	h_{0}(∞,∞,4) (∞.∞.∞)^{∞}	t_{01}(∞,∞,4) 4.∞.∞.∞	h_{01}(∞,∞,4); 4.4.∞.4.∞.4.∞	t_{1}(∞,∞,4) ∞^{8}	h_{1}(∞,∞,4) (8.∞)^{8}	t_{12}(∞,∞,4) 4.∞.∞.∞	h_{12}(∞,∞,4); 4.4.∞.4.∞.4.∞	t_{2}(∞,∞,4) (∞.4)^{∞}	h_{2}(∞,∞,4) (∞.∞.∞)^{∞}	t_{02}(∞,∞,4) (∞.8)^{2}	h_{02}(∞,∞,4) (4.∞.4.4)^{2}	t_{012}(∞,∞,4) 8.∞.∞	s(∞,∞,4); 3.4.3.∞.3.∞
(∞ 5 5)	t_{0}(∞,5,5) (∞.5)^{5}		t_{01}(∞,5,5) (5.∞)^{2}		t_{1}(∞,5,5) (5.∞)^{5}		t_{12}(∞,5,5) 5.10.∞.10		t_{2}(∞,5,5) 5^{∞}		t_{02}(∞,5,5) 5.10.∞.10		t_{012}(∞,5,5) 10.10.∞	s(∞,5,5); 3.5.3.5.3.∞
(∞ 6 5)	t_{0}(∞,6,5) (∞.5)^{6}		t_{01}(∞,6,5) 5.∞.6.∞		t_{1}(∞,6,5) (6.∞)^{5}	h_{1}(∞,6,5) (10.3.10.∞)^{5}	t_{12}(∞,6,5) 5.12.∞.12		t_{2}(∞,6,5) (6.5)^{∞}		t_{02}(∞,6,5) 6.10.∞.10	h_{02}(∞,6,5); 4.3.4.5.4.∞.4.5	t_{012}(∞,6,5) 10.12.∞	s(∞,6,5); 3.5.3.6.3.∞
(∞ 7 5)	t_{0}(∞,7,5) (∞.5)^{7}		t_{01}(∞,7,5) 5.∞.7.∞		t_{1}(∞,7,5) (7.∞)^{5}		t_{12}(∞,7,5) 5.14.∞.14		t_{2}(∞,7,5) (7.5)^{∞}		t_{02}(∞,7,5) 7.10.∞.10		t_{012}(∞,7,5) 10.14.∞	s(∞,7,5); 3.5.3.7.3.∞
(∞ 8 5)	t_{0}(∞,8,5) (∞.5)^{8}		t_{01}(∞,8,5) 5.∞.8.∞		t_{1}(∞,8,5) (8.∞)^{5}	h_{1}(∞,8,5) (10.4.10.∞)^{5}	t_{12}(∞,8,5) 5.16.∞.16		t_{2}(∞,8,5) (8.5)^{∞}		t_{02}(∞,8,5) 8.10.∞.10	h_{02}(∞,8,5); 4.4.4.5.4.∞.4.5	t_{012}(∞,8,5) 10.16.∞	s(∞,8,5); 3.5.3.8.3.∞
(∞ ∞ 5)	t_{0}(∞,∞,5) (∞.5)^{∞}		t_{01}(∞,∞,5) 5.∞.∞.∞		t_{1}(∞,∞,5) ∞^{10}	h_{1}(∞,∞,5) (10.∞)^{10}	t_{12}(∞,∞,5) 5.∞.∞.∞		t_{2}(∞,∞,5) (∞.5)^{∞}		t_{02}(∞,∞,5) (∞.10)^{2}	h_{02}(∞,∞,5) (4.∞.4.5)^{2}	t_{012}(∞,∞,5) 10.∞.∞	s(∞,∞,5); 3.5.3.∞.3.∞
(∞ 6 6)	t_{0}(∞,6,6) (∞.6)^{6}	h_{0}(∞,6,6) (12.∞.12.3)^{6}	t_{01}(∞,6,6) (6.∞)^{2}	h_{01}(∞,6,6) (4.3.4.∞)^{2}	t_{1}(∞,6,6) (6.∞)^{6}	h_{1}(∞,6,6) (12.3.12.∞)^{6}	t_{12}(∞,6,6) 6.12.∞.12	h_{12}(∞,6,6); 4.3.4.6.4.∞.4.6	t_{2}(∞,6,6) 6^{∞}	h_{2}(∞,6,6) (∞.3)^{∞}	t_{02}(∞,6,6) 6.12.∞.12	h_{02}(∞,6,6); 4.3.4.6.4.∞.4.6	t_{012}(∞,6,6) 12.12.∞	s(∞,6,6); 3.6.3.6.3.∞
(∞ 7 6)	t_{0}(∞,7,6) (∞.6)^{7}	h_{0}(∞,7,6) (14.∞.14.3)^{7}	t_{01}(∞,7,6) 6.∞.7.∞		t_{1}(∞,7,6) (7.∞)^{6}		t_{12}(∞,7,6) 6.14.∞.14	h_{12}(∞,7,6); 4.3.4.7.4.∞.4.7	t_{2}(∞,7,6) (7.6)^{∞}		t_{02}(∞,7,6) 7.12.∞.12		t_{012}(∞,7,6) 12.14.∞	s(∞,7,6); 3.6.3.7.3.∞
(∞ 8 6)	t_{0}(∞,8,6) (∞.6)^{8}	h_{0}(∞,8,6) (16.∞.16.3)^{8}	t_{01}(∞,8,6) 6.∞.8.∞	h_{01}(∞,8,6); 4.3.4.∞.4.4.4.∞	t_{1}(∞,8,6) (8.∞)^{6}	h_{1}(∞,8,6) (12.4.12.∞)^{6}	t_{12}(∞,8,6) 6.16.∞.16	h_{12}(∞,8,6); 4.3.4.8.4.∞.4.8	t_{2}(∞,8,6) (8.6)^{∞}	h_{2}(∞,8,6) (∞.4.∞.3)^{∞}	t_{02}(∞,8,6) 8.12.∞.12	h_{02}(∞,8,6); 4.4.4.6.4.∞.4.6	t_{012}(∞,8,6) 12.16.∞	s(∞,8,6); 3.6.3.8.3.∞
(∞ ∞ 6)	t_{0}(∞,∞,6) (∞.6)^{∞}	h_{0}(∞,∞,6) (∞.∞.∞.3)^{∞}	t_{01}(∞,∞,6) 6.∞.∞.∞	h_{01}(∞,∞,6); 4.3.4.∞.4.∞.4.∞	t_{1}(∞,∞,6) ∞^{12}	h_{1}(∞,∞,6) (12.∞)^{12}	t_{12}(∞,∞,6) 6.∞.∞.∞	h_{12}(∞,∞,6); 4.3.4.∞.4.∞.4.∞	t_{2}(∞,∞,6) (∞.6)^{∞}	h_{2}(∞,∞,6) (∞.∞.∞.3)^{∞}	t_{02}(∞,∞,6) (∞.12)^{2}	h_{02}(∞,∞,6) (4.∞.4.6)^{2}	t_{012}(∞,∞,6) 12.∞.∞	s(∞,∞,6); 3.6.3.∞.3.∞
(∞ 7 7)	t_{0}(∞,7,7) (∞.7)^{7}		t_{01}(∞,7,7) (7.∞)^{2}		t_{1}(∞,7,7) (7.∞)^{7}		t_{12}(∞,7,7) 7.14.∞.14		t_{2}(∞,7,7) 7^{∞}		t_{02}(∞,7,7) 7.14.∞.14		t_{012}(∞,7,7) 14.14.∞	s(∞,7,7); 3.7.3.7.3.∞
(∞ 8 7)	t_{0}(∞,8,7) (∞.7)^{8}		t_{01}(∞,8,7) 7.∞.8.∞		t_{1}(∞,8,7) (8.∞)^{7}	h_{1}(∞,8,7) (14.4.14.∞)^{7}	t_{12}(∞,8,7) 7.16.∞.16		t_{2}(∞,8,7) (8.7)^{∞}		t_{02}(∞,8,7) 8.14.∞.14	h_{02}(∞,8,7); 4.4.4.7.4.∞.4.7	t_{012}(∞,8,7) 14.16.∞	s(∞,8,7); 3.7.3.8.3.∞
(∞ ∞ 7)	t_{0}(∞,∞,7) (∞.7)^{∞}		t_{01}(∞,∞,7) 7.∞.∞.∞		t_{1}(∞,∞,7) ∞^{14}	h_{1}(∞,∞,7) (14.∞)^{14}	t_{12}(∞,∞,7) 7.∞.∞.∞		t_{2}(∞,∞,7) (∞.7)^{∞}		t_{02}(∞,∞,7) (∞.14)^{2}	h_{02}(∞,∞,7) (4.∞.4.7)^{2}	t_{012}(∞,∞,7) 14.∞.∞	s(∞,∞,7); 3.7.3.∞.3.∞
(∞ 8 8)	t_{0}(∞,8,8) (∞.8)^{8}	h_{0}(∞,8,8) (16.∞.16.4)^{8}	t_{01}(∞,8,8) (8.∞)^{2}	h_{01}(∞,8,8) (4.4.4.∞)^{2}	t_{1}(∞,8,8) (8.∞)^{8}	h_{1}(∞,8,8) (16.4.16.∞)^{8}	t_{12}(∞,8,8) 8.16.∞.16	h_{12}(∞,8,8); 4.4.4.8.4.∞.4.8	t_{2}(∞,8,8) 8^{∞}	h_{2}(∞,8,8) (∞.4)^{∞}	t_{02}(∞,8,8) 8.16.∞.16	h_{02}(∞,8,8); 4.4.4.8.4.∞.4.8	t_{012}(∞,8,8) 16.16.∞	s(∞,8,8); 3.8.3.8.3.∞
(∞ ∞ 8)	t_{0}(∞,∞,8) (∞.8)^{∞}	h_{0}(∞,∞,8) (∞.∞.∞.4)^{∞}	t_{01}(∞,∞,8) 8.∞.∞.∞	h_{01}(∞,∞,8); 4.4.4.∞.4.∞.4.∞	t_{1}(∞,∞,8) ∞^{16}	h_{1}(∞,∞,8) (16.∞)^{16}	t_{12}(∞,∞,8) 8.∞.∞.∞	h_{12}(∞,∞,8); 4.4.4.∞.4.∞.4.∞	t_{2}(∞,∞,8) (∞.8)^{∞}	h_{2}(∞,∞,8) (∞.∞.∞.4)^{∞}	t_{02}(∞,∞,8) (∞.16)^{2}	h_{02}(∞,∞,8) (4.∞.4.8)^{2}	t_{012}(∞,∞,8) 16.∞.∞	s(∞,∞,8); 3.8.3.∞.3.∞
(∞ ∞ ∞)	t_{0}(∞,∞,∞) ∞^{∞}	h_{0}(∞,∞,∞) (∞.∞)^{∞}	t_{01}(∞,∞,∞) (∞.∞)^{2}	h_{01}(∞,∞,∞) (4.∞.4.∞)^{2}	t_{1}(∞,∞,∞) ∞^{∞}	h_{1}(∞,∞,∞) (∞.∞)^{∞}	t_{12}(∞,∞,∞) (∞.∞)^{2}	h_{12}(∞,∞,∞) (4.∞.4.∞)^{2}	t_{2}(∞,∞,∞) ∞^{∞}	h_{2}(∞,∞,∞) (∞.∞)^{∞}	t_{02}(∞,∞,∞) (∞.∞)^{2}	h_{02}(∞,∞,∞) (4.∞.4.∞)^{2}	t_{012}(∞,∞,∞) ∞^{3}	s(∞,∞,∞) (3.∞)^{3}
