= Order-8 triangular tiling =

Concept in geometry

Order-8 triangular tiling
Poincaré disk model of the hyperbolic plane
Type	Hyperbolic regular tiling
Vertex configuration	3^{8}
Schläfli symbol	{3,8} (3,4,3)
Wythoff symbol	8 | 3 2; 4 | 3 3
Coxeter diagram	
Symmetry group	[8,3], (*832) [(4,3,3)], (*433) [(4,4,4)], (*444)
Dual	Octagonal tiling
Properties	Vertex-transitive, edge-transitive, face-transitive

In geometry, the order-8 triangular tiling is a regular tiling of the hyperbolic plane. It is represented by Schläfli symbol of {3,8}, having eight regular triangles around each vertex.

== Uniform colorings ==
The half symmetry [1^{+},8,3] = [(4,3,3)] can be shown with alternating two colors of triangles:

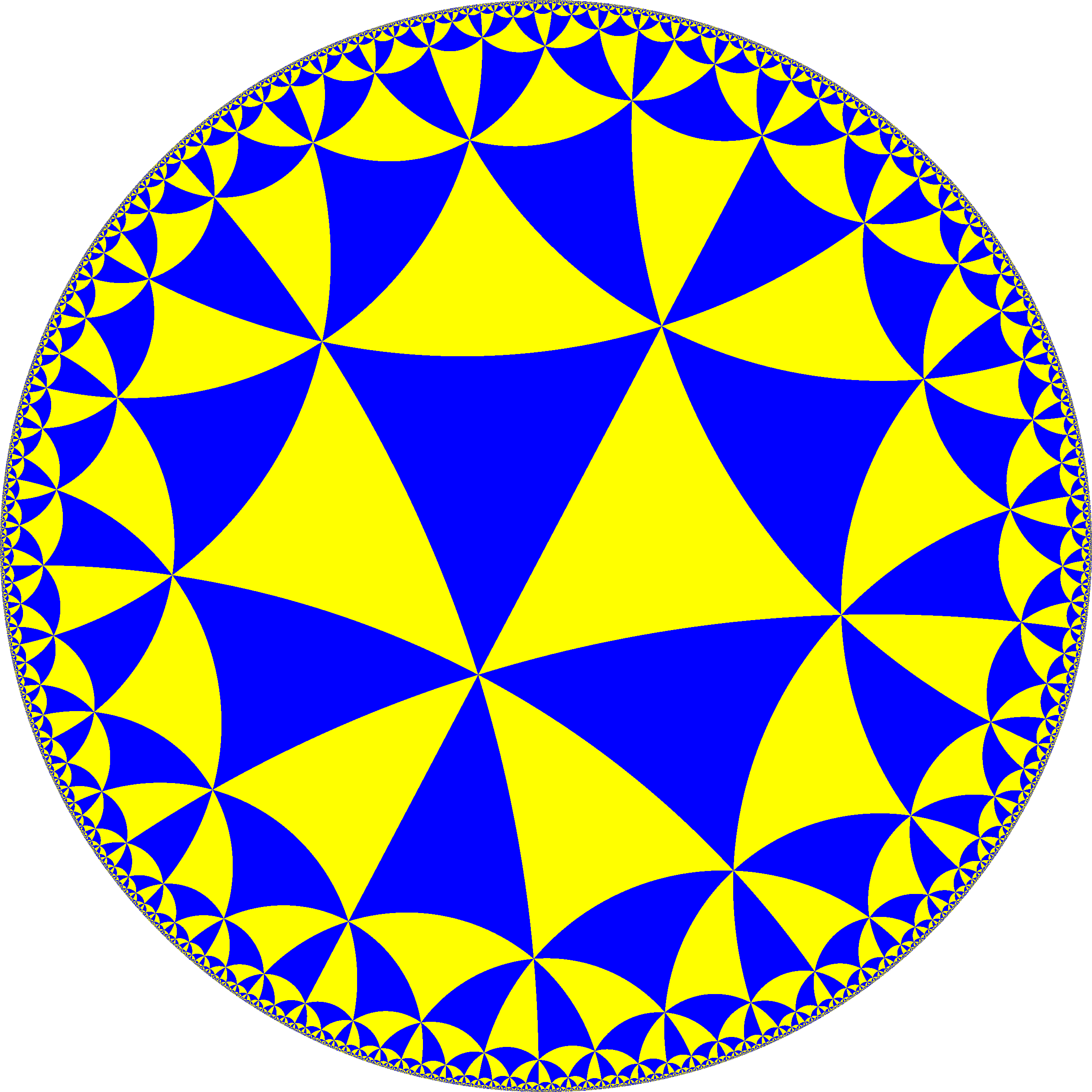

== Symmetry ==
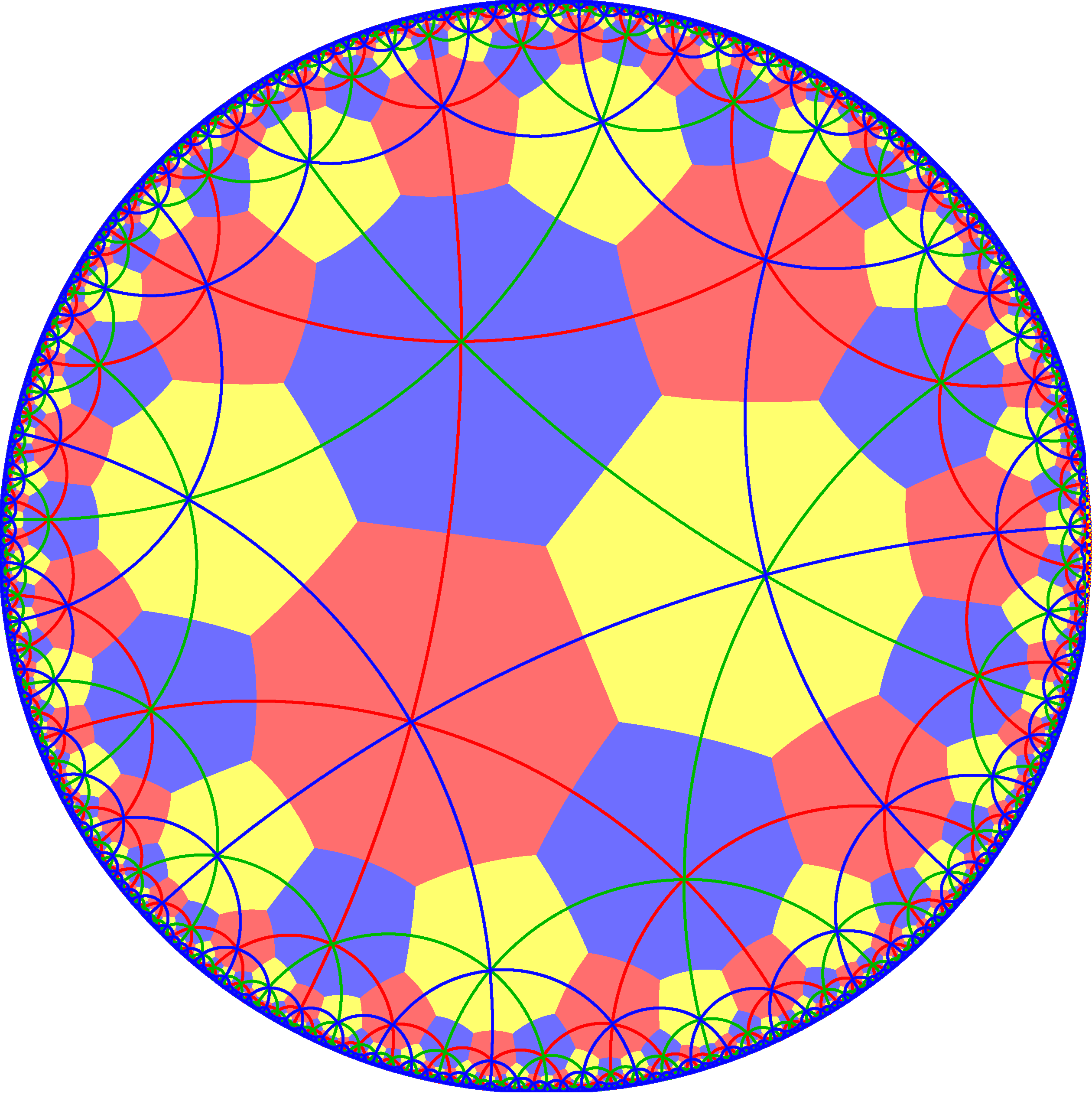
Octagonal tiling with *444 mirror lines,.

From [(4,4,4)] symmetry, there are 15 small index subgroups (7 unique) by mirror removal and alternation operators. Mirrors can be removed if its branch orders are all even, and cuts neighboring branch orders in half. Removing two mirrors leaves a half-order gyration point where the removed mirrors met. In these images fundamental domains are alternately colored black and white, and mirrors exist on the boundaries between colors. Adding 3 bisecting mirrors across each fundamental domains creates 832 symmetry. The subgroup index-8 group, [(1^{+},4,1^{+},4,1^{+},4)] (222222) is the commutator subgroup of [(4,4,4)].

A larger subgroup is constructed [(4,4,4^{*})], index 8, as (2*2222) with gyration points removed, becomes (*22222222).

The symmetry can be doubled to 842 symmetry by adding a bisecting mirror across the fundamental domains. The symmetry can be extended by 6, as 832 symmetry, by 3 bisecting mirrors per domain.

Small index subgroups of [(4,4,4)] (*444)
Index	1	2			4	
Diagram						
Coxeter	[(4,4,4)]	[(1^{+},4,4,4)] =	[(4,1^{+},4,4)] =	[(4,4,1^{+},4)] =	[(1^{+},4,1^{+},4,4)]	[(4^{+},4^{+},4)]
Orbifold	*444	*4242			2*222	222×
Diagram						
Coxeter		[(4,4^{+},4)]	[(4,4,4^{+})]	[(4^{+},4,4)]	[(4,1^{+},4,1^{+},4)]	[(1^{+},4,4,1^{+},4)] =
Orbifold		4*22			2*222	
Direct subgroups
Index	2	4			8	
Diagram						
Coxeter	[(4,4,4)]^{+}	[(4,4^{+},4)]^{+} =	[(4,4,4^{+})]^{+} =	[(4^{+},4,4)]^{+} =	[(4,1^{+},4,1^{+},4)]^{+} =	
Orbifold	444	4242			222222	
Radical subgroups
Index	8			16		
Diagram						
Coxeter	[(4,4*,4)]	[(4,4,4*)]	[(4*,4,4)]	[(4,4*,4)]^{+}	[(4,4,4*)]^{+}	[(4*,4,4)]^{+}
Orbifold	*22222222			22222222		

== Related polyhedra and tilings ==
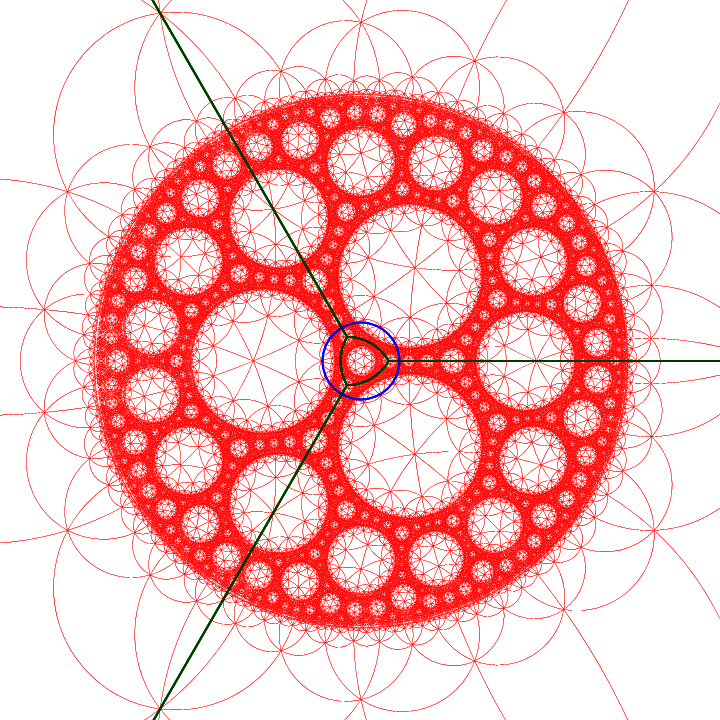
The {3,3,8} honeycomb has {3,8} vertex figures.

*n32 symmetry mutation of regular tilings: {3,n}
Spherical				Euclid.	Compact hyper.		Paraco.	Noncompact hyperbolic			
3.3	3^{3}	3^{4}	3^{5}	3^{6}	3^{7}	3^{8}	3^{∞}	3^{12i}	3^{9i}	3^{6i}	3^{3i}

From a Wythoff construction there are ten hyperbolic uniform tilings that can be based from the regular octagonal and order-8 triangular tilings.

Drawing the tiles colored as red on the original faces, yellow at the original vertices, and blue along the original edges, there are 10 forms.

Uniform octagonal/triangular tilings
Symmetry: [8,3], (*832)							[8,3]^{+} (832)	[1^{+},8,3] (*443)		[8,3^{+}] (3*4)
{8,3}	t{8,3}	r{8,3}	t{3,8}	{3,8}	rr{8,3} s_{2}{3,8}	tr{8,3}	sr{8,3}	h{8,3}	h_{2}{8,3}	s{3,8}
								or	or	
Uniform duals
V8^{3}	V3.16.16	V3.8.3.8	V6.6.8	V3^{8}	V3.4.8.4	V4.6.16	V3^{4}.8	V(3.4)^{3}	V8.6.6	V3^{5}.4

Regular tilings: {n,8}
Spherical	Hyperbolic tilings							
{2,8}	{3,8}	{4,8}	{5,8}	{6,8}	{7,8}	{8,8}	...	{∞,8}

It can also be generated from the (4 3 3) hyperbolic tilings:

Uniform (4,3,3) tilings
Symmetry: [(4,3,3)], (*433)							[(4,3,3)]^{+}, (433)
h{8,3} t_{0}(4,3,3)	r{3,8}^{1}/_{2} t_{0,1}(4,3,3)	h{8,3} t_{1}(4,3,3)	h_{2}{8,3} t_{1,2}(4,3,3)	{3,8}^{1}/_{2} t_{2}(4,3,3)	h_{2}{8,3} t_{0,2}(4,3,3)	t{3,8}^{1}/_{2} t_{0,1,2}(4,3,3)	s{3,8}^{1}/_{2} s(4,3,3)
Uniform duals
V(3.4)^{3}	V3.8.3.8	V(3.4)^{3}	V3.6.4.6	V(3.3)^{4}	V3.6.4.6	V6.6.8	V3.3.3.3.3.4

Uniform (4,4,4) tilings
Symmetry: [(4,4,4)], (*444)							[(4,4,4)]^{+} (444)	[(1^{+},4,4,4)] (*4242)	[(4^{+},4,4)] (4*22)
t_{0}(4,4,4) h{8,4}	t_{0,1}(4,4,4) h_{2}{8,4}	t_{1}(4,4,4) {4,8}^{1}/_{2}	t_{1,2}(4,4,4) h_{2}{8,4}	t_{2}(4,4,4) h{8,4}	t_{0,2}(4,4,4) r{4,8}^{1}/_{2}	t_{0,1,2}(4,4,4) t{4,8}^{1}/_{2}	s(4,4,4) s{4,8}^{1}/_{2}	h(4,4,4) h{4,8}^{1}/_{2}	hr(4,4,4) hr{4,8}^{1}/_{2}
Uniform duals
V(4.4)^{4}	V4.8.4.8	V(4.4)^{4}	V4.8.4.8	V(4.4)^{4}	V4.8.4.8	V8.8.8	V3.4.3.4.3.4	V8^{8}	V(4,4)^{3}

== See also ==
- Order-8 tetrahedral honeycomb
- Tilings of regular polygons
- List of uniform planar tilings
- List of regular polytopes
