= Order-6-4 square honeycomb =

Regular space-filling tessellation

Order-4-6 square honeycomb
Type	Regular honeycomb
Schläfli symbol	{4,6,4}
Coxeter diagrams	
Cells	{4,6}
Faces	{4}
Edge figure	{4}
Vertex figure	{6,4}
Dual	self-dual
Coxeter group	[4,6,4]
Properties	Regular

In the geometry of hyperbolic 3-space, the order-6-4 square honeycomb (or 4,6,4 honeycomb) a regular space-filling tessellation (or honeycomb) with Schläfli symbol {4,6,4}.

== Geometry ==
All vertices are ultra-ideal (existing beyond the ideal boundary) with four order-6 square tilings existing around each edge and with an order-4 hexagonal tiling vertex figure.

Poincaré disk model	Ideal surface

== Related polytopes and honeycombs ==
It a part of a sequence of regular polychora and honeycombs {p,6,p}:

=== Order-6-5 hexagonal honeycomb ===
Order-6-5 pentagonal honeycomb
Type	Regular honeycomb
Schläfli symbol	{5,6,5}
Coxeter diagrams	
Cells	{5,6}
Faces	{5}
Edge figure	{5}
Vertex figure	{6,5}
Dual	self-dual
Coxeter group	[5,6,5]
Properties	Regular

In the geometry of hyperbolic 3-space, the order-6-5 pentagonal honeycomb (or 5,6,5 honeycomb) a regular space-filling tessellation (or honeycomb) with Schläfli symbol {5,6,5}.

All vertices are ultra-ideal (existing beyond the ideal boundary) with five order-6 pentagonal tilings existing around each edge and with an order-5 hexagonal tiling vertex figure.

Poincaré disk model	Ideal surface

=== Order-6-6 hexagonal honeycomb ===
Order-5-6 hexagonal honeycomb
Type	Regular honeycomb
Schläfli symbols	{6,6,6} {6,(6,3,6)}
Coxeter diagrams	=
Cells	{6,6}
Faces	{6}
Edge figure	{6}
Vertex figure	{6,6} {(6,3,6)}
Dual	self-dual
Coxeter group	[6,5,6] [6,((6,3,6))]
Properties	Regular

In the geometry of hyperbolic 3-space, the order-6-6 hexagonal honeycomb (or 6,6,6 honeycomb) is a regular space-filling tessellation (or honeycomb) with Schläfli symbol {6,6,6}. It has six order-6 hexagonal tilings, {6,6}, around each edge. All vertices are ultra-ideal (existing beyond the ideal boundary) with infinitely many hexagonal tilings existing around each vertex in an order-6 hexagonal tiling vertex arrangement.

Poincaré disk model	Ideal surface

It has a second construction as a uniform honeycomb, Schläfli symbol {6,(6,3,6)}, Coxeter diagram,, with alternating types or colors of cells. In Coxeter notation the half symmetry is [6,6,6,1^{+}] = [6,((6,3,6))].

=== Order-6-infinite apeirogonal honeycomb ===
Order-6-infinite apeirogonal honeycomb
Type	Regular honeycomb
Schläfli symbols	{∞,6,∞} {∞,(6,∞,6)}
Coxeter diagrams	↔
Cells	{∞,6}
Faces	{∞}
Edge figure	{∞}
Vertex figure	{6,∞} {(6,∞,6)}
Dual	self-dual
Coxeter group	[∞,6,∞] [∞,((6,∞,6))]
Properties	Regular

In the geometry of hyperbolic 3-space, the order-6-infinite apeirogonal honeycomb (or ∞,6,∞ honeycomb) is a regular space-filling tessellation (or honeycomb) with Schläfli symbol {∞,6,∞}. It has infinitely many order-6 apeirogonal tiling {∞,6} around each edge. All vertices are ultra-ideal (existing beyond the ideal boundary) with infinitely many order-6 apeirogonal tilings existing around each vertex in an infinite-order square tiling vertex arrangement.

Poincaré disk model	Ideal surface

It has a second construction as a uniform honeycomb, Schläfli symbol {∞,(6,∞,6)}, Coxeter diagram,, with alternating types or colors of cells.

== See also ==
- Convex uniform honeycombs in hyperbolic space
- List of regular polytopes
- Infinite-order dodecahedral honeycomb
