= Order-4-5 pentagonal honeycomb =

Order-4-5 pentagonal honeycomb
Type	Regular honeycomb
Schläfli symbol	{5,4,5}
Coxeter diagrams	
Cells	{5,4}
Faces	{5}
Edge figure	{5}
Vertex figure	{4,5}
Dual	self-dual
Coxeter group	[5,4,5]
Properties	Regular

In the geometry of hyperbolic 3-space, the order-4-5 pentagonal honeycomb a regular space-filling tessellation (or honeycomb) with Schläfli symbol {5,4,5}.

== Geometry ==
All vertices are ultra-ideal (existing beyond the ideal boundary) with five order-4 pentagonal tilings existing around each edge and with an order-5 square tiling vertex figure.

Poincaré disk model	Ideal surface

== Related polytopes and honeycombs ==
It a part of a sequence of regular polychora and honeycombs {p,4,p}:

{p,4,p} regular honeycombs
Space	S^{3}	Euclidean E^{3}	H^{3}				
Form	Finite	Paracompact	Noncompact				
Name	{3,4,3}	{4,4,4}	{5,4,5}	{6,4,6}	{7,4,7}	{8,4,8}	...{∞,4,∞}
Image							
Cells {p,4}	{3,4}	{4,4}	{5,4}	{6,4}	{7,4}	{8,4}	{∞,4}
Vertex figure {4,p}	{4,3}	{4,4}	{4,5}	{4,6}	{4,7}	{4,8}	{4,∞}

=== Order-4-6 hexagonal honeycomb ===
Order-4-6 hexagonal honeycomb
Type	Regular honeycomb
Schläfli symbols	{6,4,6} {6,(4,3,4)}
Coxeter diagrams	=
Cells	{6,4}
Faces	{6}
Edge figure	{6}
Vertex figure	{4,6} {(4,3,4)}
Dual	self-dual
Coxeter group	[6,4,6] [6,((4,3,4))]
Properties	Regular

In the geometry of hyperbolic 3-space, the order-4-6 hexagonal honeycomb is a regular space-filling tessellation (or honeycomb) with Schläfli symbol {6,3,6}. It has six order-4 hexagonal tilings, {6,4}, around each edge. All vertices are ultra-ideal (existing beyond the ideal boundary) with infinitely many hexagonal tilings existing around each vertex in an order-6 square tiling vertex arrangement.

Poincaré disk model	Ideal surface

It has a second construction as a uniform honeycomb, Schläfli symbol {6,(4,3,4)}, Coxeter diagram,, with alternating types or colors of cells. In Coxeter notation the half symmetry is [6,4,6,1^{+}] = [6,((4,3,4))].

=== Order-4-infinite apeirogonal honeycomb ===
Order-4-infinite apeirogonal honeycomb
Type	Regular honeycomb
Schläfli symbols	{∞,4,∞} {∞,(4,∞,4)}
Coxeter diagrams	↔
Cells	{∞,4}
Faces	{∞}
Edge figure	{∞}
Vertex figure	{4,∞} {(4,∞,4)}
Dual	self-dual
Coxeter group	[∞,4,∞] [∞,((4,∞,4))]
Properties	Regular

In the geometry of hyperbolic 3-space, the order-4-infinite apeirogonal honeycomb is a regular space-filling tessellation (or honeycomb) with Schläfli symbol {∞,4,∞}. It has infinitely many order-4 apeirogonal tiling {∞,4} around each edge. All vertices are ultra-ideal (existing beyond the ideal boundary) with infinitely many hexagonal tilings existing around each vertex in an infinite-order square tiling vertex arrangement.

Poincaré disk model	Ideal surface

It has a second construction as a uniform honeycomb, Schläfli symbol {∞,(4,∞,4)}, Coxeter diagram,, with alternating types or colors of cells.

== See also ==
- Convex uniform honeycombs in hyperbolic space
- List of regular polytopes
- Infinite-order dodecahedral honeycomb
