= Order-5-4 square honeycomb =

Order-4-5 square honeycomb
Type	Regular honeycomb
Schläfli symbol	{4,5,4}
Coxeter diagrams	
Cells	{4,5}
Faces	{4}
Edge figure	{4}
Vertex figure	{5,4}
Dual	self-dual
Coxeter group	[4,5,4]
Properties	Regular

In the geometry of hyperbolic 3-space, the order-5-4 square honeycomb (or 4,5,4 honeycomb) a regular space-filling tessellation (or honeycomb) with Schläfli symbol {4,5,4}.

== Geometry ==
All vertices are ultra-ideal (existing beyond the ideal boundary) with four order-5 square tilings existing around each edge and with an order-4 pentagonal tiling vertex figure.

Poincaré disk model	Ideal surface

== Related polytopes and honeycombs ==
It a part of a sequence of regular polychora and honeycombs {p,5,p}:

{p,5,p} regular honeycombs
Space	H^{3}						
Form	Compact	Noncompact					
Name	{3,5,3}	{4,5,4}	{5,5,5}	{6,5,6}	{7,5,7}	{8,5,8}	...{∞,5,∞}
Image							
Cells {p,5}	{3,5}	{4,5}	{5,5}	{6,5}	{7,5}	{8,5}	{∞,5}
Vertex figure {5,p}	{5,3}	{5,4}	{5,5}	{5,6}	{5,7}	{5,8}	{5,∞}

=== Order-5-5 pentagonal honeycomb ===
Order-5-5 pentagonal honeycomb
Type	Regular honeycomb
Schläfli symbol	{5,5,5}
Coxeter diagrams	
Cells	{5,5}
Faces	{5}
Edge figure	{5}
Vertex figure	{5,5}
Dual	self-dual
Coxeter group	[5,5,5]
Properties	Regular

In the geometry of hyperbolic 3-space, the order-5-5 pentagonal honeycomb (or 5,5,5 honeycomb) a regular space-filling tessellation (or honeycomb) with Schläfli symbol {5,5,5}.

All vertices are ultra-ideal (existing beyond the ideal boundary) with five order-5 pentagonal tilings existing around each edge and with an order-5 pentagonal tiling vertex figure.

Poincaré disk model	Ideal surface

=== Order-5-6 hexagonal honeycomb ===
Order-5-6 hexagonal honeycomb
Type	Regular honeycomb
Schläfli symbols	{6,5,6} {6,(5,3,5)}
Coxeter diagrams	=
Cells	{6,5}
Faces	{6}
Edge figure	{6}
Vertex figure	{5,6} {(5,3,5)}
Dual	self-dual
Coxeter group	[6,5,6] [6,((5,3,5))]
Properties	Regular

In the geometry of hyperbolic 3-space, the order-5-6 hexagonal honeycomb (or 6,5,6 honeycomb) is a regular space-filling tessellation (or honeycomb) with Schläfli symbol {6,5,6}. It has six order-5 hexagonal tilings, {6,5}, around each edge. All vertices are ultra-ideal (existing beyond the ideal boundary) with infinitely many hexagonal tilings existing around each vertex in an order-6 pentagonal tiling vertex arrangement.

Poincaré disk model	Ideal surface

It has a second construction as a uniform honeycomb, Schläfli symbol {6,(5,3,5)}, Coxeter diagram,, with alternating types or colors of cells. In Coxeter notation the half symmetry is [6,5,6,1^{+}] = [6,((5,3,5))].

=== Order-5-7 heptagonal honeycomb ===
Order-5-7 hexagonal honeycomb
Type	Regular honeycomb
Schläfli symbols	{7,5,7}
Coxeter diagrams	
Cells	{7,5}
Faces	{6}
Edge figure	{6}
Vertex figure	{5,7}
Dual	self-dual
Coxeter group	[7,5,7]
Properties	Regular

In the geometry of hyperbolic 3-space, the order-5-7 heptagonal honeycomb (or 7,5,7 honeycomb) is a regular space-filling tessellation (or honeycomb) with Schläfli symbol {7,5,7}. It has seven order-5 heptagonal tilings, {7,5}, around each edge. All vertices are ultra-ideal (existing beyond the ideal boundary) with infinitely many heptagonal tilings existing around each vertex in an order-7 pentagonal tiling vertex arrangement.

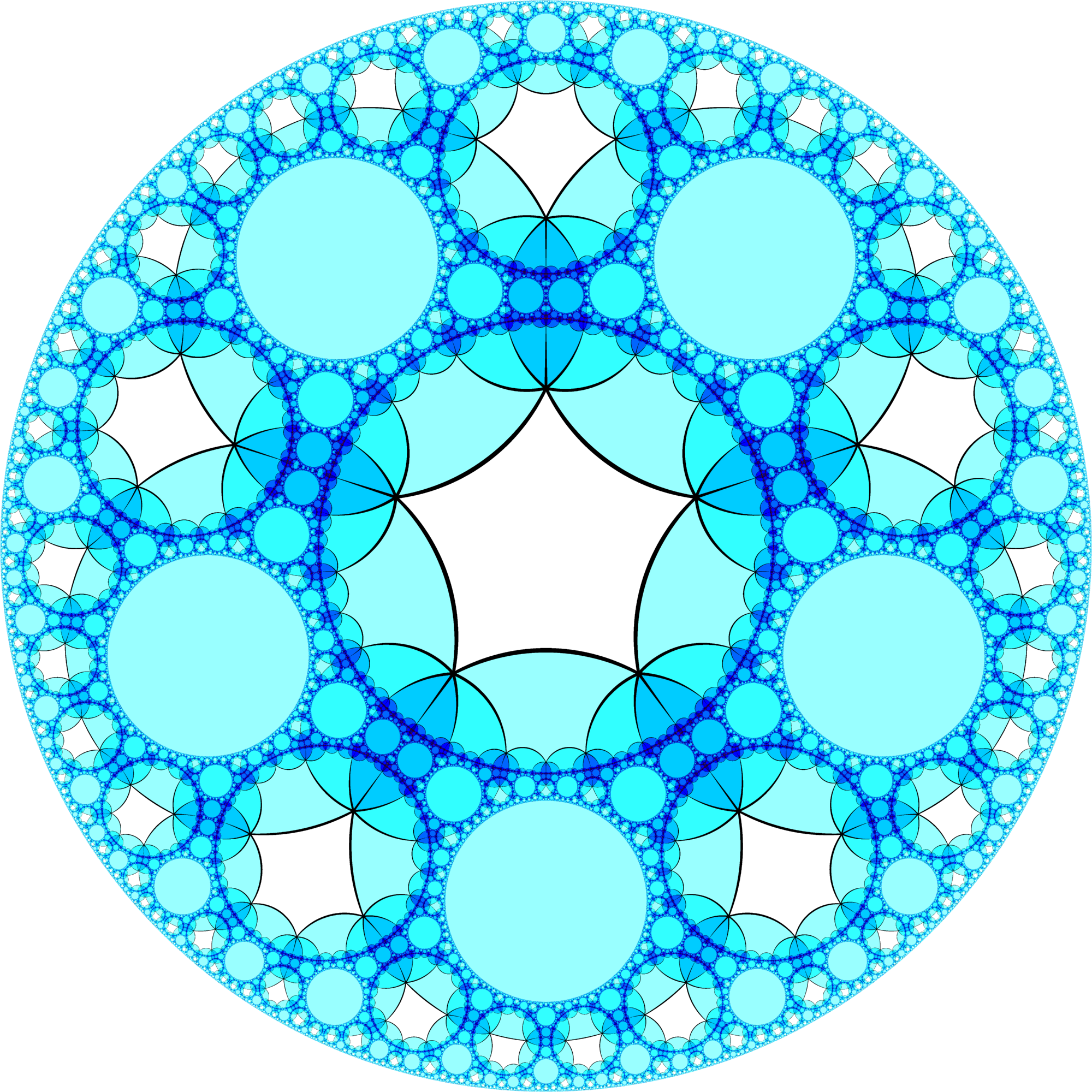
Ideal surface

=== Order-5-infinite apeirogonal honeycomb ===
Order-5-infinite apeirogonal honeycomb
Type	Regular honeycomb
Schläfli symbols	{∞,5,∞} {∞,(5,∞,5)}
Coxeter diagrams	↔
Cells	{∞,5}
Faces	{∞}
Edge figure	{∞}
Vertex figure	{5,∞} {(5,∞,5)}
Dual	self-dual
Coxeter group	[∞,5,∞] [∞,((5,∞,5))]
Properties	Regular

In the geometry of hyperbolic 3-space, the order-5-infinite apeirogonal honeycomb (or ∞,5,∞ honeycomb) is a regular space-filling tessellation (or honeycomb) with Schläfli symbol {∞,5,∞}. It has infinitely many order-5 apeirogonal tilings {∞,5} around each edge. All vertices are ultra-ideal (existing beyond the ideal boundary) with infinitely many order-5 apeirogonal tilings existing around each vertex in an infinite-order pentagonal tiling vertex arrangement.

Poincaré disk model	Ideal surface

It has a second construction as a uniform honeycomb, Schläfli symbol {∞,(5,∞,5)}, Coxeter diagram,, with alternating types or colors of cells.

== See also ==
- Convex uniform honeycombs in hyperbolic space
- List of regular polytopes
- Infinite-order dodecahedral honeycomb
