= Order-7 tetrahedral honeycomb =

Order-7 tetrahedral honeycomb
Type	Hyperbolic regular honeycomb
Schläfli symbols	{3,3,7}
Coxeter diagrams	
Cells	{3,3}
Faces	{3}
Edge figure	{7}
Vertex figure	{3,7}
Dual	{7,3,3}
Coxeter group	[7,3,3]
Properties	Regular

In the geometry of hyperbolic 3-space, the order-7 tetrahedral honeycomb is a regular space-filling tessellation (or honeycomb) with Schläfli symbol {3,3,7}. It has seven tetrahedra {3,3} around each edge. All vertices are ultra-ideal (existing beyond the ideal boundary) with infinitely many tetrahedra existing around each vertex in an order-7 triangular tiling vertex arrangement.

== Images ==
Poincaré disk model (cell-centered)	Rendered intersection of honeycomb with the ideal plane in Poincaré half-space model

== Related polytopes and honeycombs ==
It is a part of a sequence of regular polychora and honeycombs with tetrahedral cells, {3,3,p}.

{3,3,p} polytopes
Space	S^{3}			H^{3}			
Form	Finite			Paracompact	Noncompact		
Name	{3,3,3}	{3,3,4}	{3,3,5}	{3,3,6}	{3,3,7}	{3,3,8}	... {3,3,∞}
Image							
Vertex figure	{3,3}	{3,4}	{3,5}	{3,6}	{3,7}	{3,8}	{3,∞}

It is a part of a sequence of hyperbolic honeycombs with order-7 triangular tiling vertex figures, {p,3,7}.

{3,3,7}	{4,3,7}	{5,3,7}	{6,3,7}	{7,3,7}	{8,3,7}	{∞,3,7}

It is a part of a sequence of hyperbolic honeycombs, {3,p,7}.

=== Order-8 tetrahedral honeycomb ===
Order-8 tetrahedral honeycomb
Type	Hyperbolic regular honeycomb
Schläfli symbols	{3,3,8} {3,(3,4,3)}
Coxeter diagrams	=
Cells	{3,3}
Faces	{3}
Edge figure	{8}
Vertex figure	{3,8} {(3,4,3)}
Dual	{8,3,3}
Coxeter group	[3,3,8] [3,((3,4,3))]
Properties	Regular

In the geometry of hyperbolic 3-space, the order-8 tetrahedral honeycomb is a regular space-filling tessellation (or honeycomb) with Schläfli symbol {3,3,8}. It has eight tetrahedra {3,3} around each edge. All vertices are ultra-ideal (existing beyond the ideal boundary) with infinitely many tetrahedra existing around each vertex in an order-8 triangular tiling vertex arrangement.

Poincaré disk model (cell-centered)	Rendered intersection of honeycomb with the ideal plane in Poincaré half-space model

It has a second construction as a uniform honeycomb, Schläfli symbol {3,(3,4,3)}, Coxeter diagram,, with alternating types or colors of tetrahedral cells. In Coxeter notation the half symmetry is [3,3,8,1^{+}] = [3,((3,4,3))].

=== Infinite-order tetrahedral honeycomb ===
Infinite-order tetrahedral honeycomb
Type	Hyperbolic regular honeycomb
Schläfli symbols	{3,3,∞} {3,(3,∞,3)}
Coxeter diagrams	=
Cells	{3,3}
Faces	{3}
Edge figure	{∞}
Vertex figure	{3,∞} {(3,∞,3)}
Dual	{∞,3,3}
Coxeter group	[∞,3,3] [3,((3,∞,3))]
Properties	Regular

In the geometry of hyperbolic 3-space, the infinite-order tetrahedral honeycomb is a regular space-filling tessellation (or honeycomb) with Schläfli symbol {3,3,∞}. It has infinitely many tetrahedra {3,3} around each edge. All vertices are ultra-ideal (existing beyond the ideal boundary) with infinitely many tetrahedra existing around each vertex in an infinite-order triangular tiling vertex arrangement.

Poincaré disk model (cell-centered)	Rendered intersection of honeycomb with the ideal plane in Poincaré half-space model

It has a second construction as a uniform honeycomb, Schläfli symbol {3,(3,∞,3)}, Coxeter diagram, =, with alternating types or colors of tetrahedral cells. In Coxeter notation the half symmetry is [3,3,∞,1^{+}] = [3,((3,∞,3))].

== See also ==
- Convex uniform honeycombs in hyperbolic space
- List of regular polytopes
