= Order-3-7 heptagonal honeycomb =

Regular space-filling tessellation with Schläfli symbol (7,3,7)

Order-3-7 heptagonal honeycomb
Type	Regular honeycomb
Schläfli symbol	{7,3,7}
Coxeter diagrams	
Cells	{7,3}
Faces	{7}
Edge figure	{7}
Vertex figure	{3,7}
Dual	self-dual
Coxeter group	[7,3,7]
Properties	Regular

In the geometry of hyperbolic 3-space, the order-3-7 heptagonal honeycomb a regular space-filling tessellation (or honeycomb) with Schläfli symbol {7,3,7}.

== Geometry ==
All vertices are ultra-ideal (existing beyond the ideal boundary) with seven heptagonal tilings existing around each edge and with an order-7 triangular tiling vertex figure.

Poincaré disk model	Ideal surface

== Related polytopes and honeycombs ==
It a part of a sequence of regular polychora and honeycombs {p,3,p}:

{p,3,p} regular honeycombs
Space	S^{3}	Euclidean E^{3}	H^{3}				
Form	Finite	Affine	Compact	Paracompact	Noncompact		
Name	{3,3,3}	{4,3,4}	{5,3,5}	{6,3,6}	{7,3,7}	{8,3,8}	...{∞,3,∞}
Image							
Cells	{3,3}	{4,3}	{5,3}	{6,3}	{7,3}	{8,3}	{∞,3}
Vertex figure	{3,3}	{3,4}	{3,5}	{3,6}	{3,7}	{3,8}	{3,∞}

=== Order-3-8 octagonal honeycomb ===
Order-3-8 octagonal honeycomb
Type	Regular honeycomb
Schläfli symbols	{8,3,8} {8,(3,4,3)}
Coxeter diagrams	=
Cells	{8,3}
Faces	{8}
Edge figure	{8}
Vertex figure	{3,8} {(3,8,3)}
Dual	self-dual
Coxeter group	[8,3,8] [8,((3,4,3))]
Properties	Regular

In the geometry of hyperbolic 3-space, the order-3-8 octagonal honeycomb is a regular space-filling tessellation (or honeycomb) with Schläfli symbol {8,3,8}. It has eight octagonal tilings, {8,3}, around each edge. All vertices are ultra-ideal (existing beyond the ideal boundary) with infinitely many octagonal tilings existing around each vertex in an order-8 triangular tiling vertex arrangement.

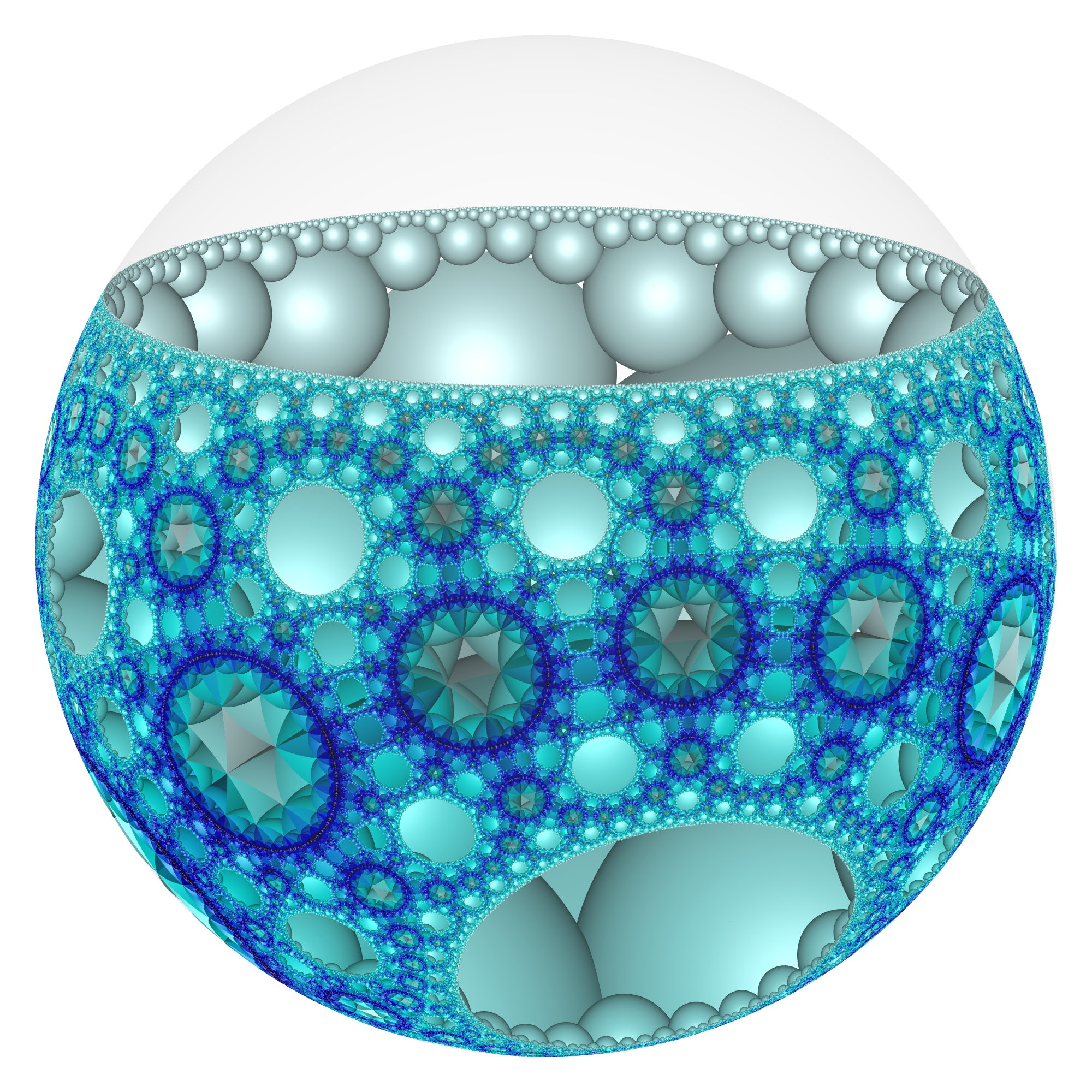
Poincaré disk model

It has a second construction as a uniform honeycomb, Schläfli symbol {8,(3,4,3)}, Coxeter diagram,, with alternating types or colors of cells. In Coxeter notation the half symmetry is [8,3,8,1^{+}] = [8,((3,4,3))].

=== Order-3-infinite apeirogonal honeycomb ===
Order-3-infinite apeirogonal honeycomb
Type	Regular honeycomb
Schläfli symbols	{∞,3,∞} {∞,(3,∞,3)}
Coxeter diagrams	↔
Cells	{∞,3}
Faces	{∞}
Edge figure	{∞}
Vertex figure	{3,∞} {(3,∞,3)}
Dual	self-dual
Coxeter group	[∞,3,∞] [∞,((3,∞,3))]
Properties	Regular

In the geometry of hyperbolic 3-space, the order-3-infinite apeirogonal honeycomb is a regular space-filling tessellation (or honeycomb) with Schläfli symbol {∞,3,∞}. It has infinitely many order-3 apeirogonal tiling {∞,3} around each edge. All vertices are ultra-ideal (Existing beyond the ideal boundary) with infinitely many apeirogonal tilings existing around each vertex in an infinite-order triangular tiling vertex arrangement.

Poincaré disk model	Ideal surface

It has a second construction as a uniform honeycomb, Schläfli symbol {∞,(3,∞,3)}, Coxeter diagram,, with alternating types or colors of apeirogonal tiling cells.

== See also ==
- Convex uniform honeycombs in hyperbolic space
- List of regular polytopes
- Infinite-order dodecahedral honeycomb
