= Order-7-3 triangular honeycomb =

Order-7-3 triangular honeycomb
Type	Regular honeycomb
Schläfli symbols	{3,7,3}
Coxeter diagrams	
Cells	{3,7}
Faces	{3}
Edge figure	{3}
Vertex figure	{7,3}
Dual	Self-dual
Coxeter group	[3,7,3]
Properties	Regular

In the geometry of hyperbolic 3-space, the order-7-3 triangular honeycomb (or 3,7,3 honeycomb) is a regular space-filling tessellation (or honeycomb) with Schläfli symbol {3,7,3}.

== Geometry ==
It has three order-7 triangular tiling {3,7} around each edge. All vertices are ultra-ideal (existing beyond the ideal boundary) with infinitely many triangular tilings existing around each vertex in a heptagonal tiling vertex figure.

Poincaré disk model	Ideal surface	Upper half space model with selective cells shown

== Related polytopes and honeycombs ==
It a part of a sequence of self-dual regular honeycombs: {p,7,p}.

It is a part of a sequence of regular honeycombs with order-7 triangular tiling cells: {3,7,p}.

It is a part of a sequence of regular honeycombs with heptagonal tiling vertex figures: {p,7,3}.

=== Order-7-4 triangular honeycomb ===
Order-7-4 triangular honeycomb
Type	Regular honeycomb
Schläfli symbols	{3,7,4}
Coxeter diagrams	=
Cells	{3,7}
Faces	{3}
Edge figure	{4}
Vertex figure	{7,4} r{7,7}
Dual	{4,7,3}
Coxeter group	[3,7,4]
Properties	Regular

In the geometry of hyperbolic 3-space, the order-7-4 triangular honeycomb (or 3,7,4 honeycomb) is a regular space-filling tessellation (or honeycomb) with Schläfli symbol {3,7,4}.

It has four order-7 triangular tilings, {3,7}, around each edge. All vertices are ultra-ideal (existing beyond the ideal boundary) with infinitely many order-7 triangular tilings existing around each vertex in an order-4 heptagonal tiling vertex arrangement.

Poincaré disk model	Ideal surface

It has a second construction as a uniform honeycomb, Schläfli symbol {3,7^{1,1}}, Coxeter diagram,, with alternating types or colors of order-7 triangular tiling cells. In Coxeter notation the half symmetry is [3,7,4,1^{+}] = [3,7^{1,1}].

=== Order-7-5 triangular honeycomb ===
Order-7-5 triangular honeycomb
Type	Regular honeycomb
Schläfli symbols	{3,7,5}
Coxeter diagrams	
Cells	{3,7}
Faces	{3}
Edge figure	{5}
Vertex figure	{7,5}
Dual	{5,7,3}
Coxeter group	[3,7,5]
Properties	Regular

In the geometry of hyperbolic 3-space, the order-7-3 triangular honeycomb (or 3,7,5 honeycomb) is a regular space-filling tessellation (or honeycomb) with Schläfli symbol {3,7,5}. It has five order-7 triangular tiling, {3,7}, around each edge. All vertices are ultra-ideal (existing beyond the ideal boundary) with infinitely many order-7 triangular tilings existing around each vertex in an order-5 heptagonal tiling vertex figure.

Poincaré disk model	Ideal surface

=== Order-7-6 triangular honeycomb ===
Order-7-6 triangular honeycomb
Type	Regular honeycomb
Schläfli symbols	{3,7,6} {3,(7,3,7)}
Coxeter diagrams	=
Cells	{3,7}
Faces	{3}
Edge figure	{6}
Vertex figure	{7,6} {(7,3,7)}
Dual	{6,7,3}
Coxeter group	[3,7,6]
Properties	Regular

In the geometry of hyperbolic 3-space, the order-7-6 triangular honeycomb (or 3,7,6 honeycomb) is a regular space-filling tessellation (or honeycomb) with Schläfli symbol {3,7,6}. It has infinitely many order-7 triangular tiling, {3,7}, around each edge. All vertices are ultra-ideal (existing beyond the ideal boundary) with infinitely many order-7 triangular tilings existing around each vertex in an order-6 heptagonal tiling, {7,6}, vertex figure.

Poincaré disk model	Ideal surface

=== Order-7-infinite triangular honeycomb ===
Order-7-infinite triangular honeycomb
Type	Regular honeycomb
Schläfli symbols	{3,7,∞} {3,(7,∞,7)}
Coxeter diagrams	=
Cells	{3,7}
Faces	{3}
Edge figure	{∞}
Vertex figure	{7,∞} {(7,∞,7)}
Dual	{∞,7,3}
Coxeter group	[∞,7,3] [3,((7,∞,7))]
Properties	Regular

In the geometry of hyperbolic 3-space, the order-7-infinite triangular honeycomb (or 3,7,∞ honeycomb) is a regular space-filling tessellation (or honeycomb) with Schläfli symbol {3,7,∞}. It has infinitely many order-7 triangular tiling, {3,7}, around each edge. All vertices are ultra-ideal (existing beyond the ideal boundary) with infinitely many order-7 triangular tilings existing around each vertex in an infinite-order heptagonal tiling, {7,∞}, vertex figure.

Poincaré disk model	Ideal surface

It has a second construction as a uniform honeycomb, Schläfli symbol {3,(7,∞,7)}, Coxeter diagram, =, with alternating types or colors of order-7 triangular tiling cells. In Coxeter notation the half symmetry is [3,7,∞,1^{+}] = [3,((7,∞,7))].

=== Order-7-3 square honeycomb ===
Order-7-3 square honeycomb
Type	Regular honeycomb
Schläfli symbol	{4,7,3}
Coxeter diagram	
Cells	{4,7}
Faces	{4}
Vertex figure	{7,3}
Dual	{3,7,4}
Coxeter group	[4,7,3]
Properties	Regular

In the geometry of hyperbolic 3-space, the order-7-3 square honeycomb (or 4,7,3 honeycomb) a regular space-filling tessellation (or honeycomb). Each infinite cell consists of a heptagonal tiling whose vertices lie on a 2-hypercycle, each of which has a limiting circle on the ideal sphere.

The Schläfli symbol of the order-7-3 square honeycomb is {4,7,3}, with three order-4 heptagonal tilings meeting at each edge. The vertex figure of this honeycomb is a heptagonal tiling, {7,3}.

Poincaré disk model	Ideal surface

=== Order-7-3 pentagonal honeycomb ===
Order-7-3 pentagonal honeycomb
Type	Regular honeycomb
Schläfli symbol	{5,7,3}
Coxeter diagram	
Cells	{5,7}
Faces	{5}
Vertex figure	{7,3}
Dual	{3,7,5}
Coxeter group	[5,7,3]
Properties	Regular

In the geometry of hyperbolic 3-space, the order-7-3 pentagonal honeycomb (or 5,7,3 honeycomb) a regular space-filling tessellation (or honeycomb). Each infinite cell consists of an order-7 pentagonal tiling whose vertices lie on a 2-hypercycle, each of which has a limiting circle on the ideal sphere.

The Schläfli symbol of the order-6-3 pentagonal honeycomb is {5,7,3}, with three order-7 pentagonal tilings meeting at each edge. The vertex figure of this honeycomb is a heptagonal tiling, {7,3}.

Poincaré disk model	Ideal surface

=== Order-7-3 hexagonal honeycomb ===
Order-7-3 hexagonal honeycomb
Type	Regular honeycomb
Schläfli symbol	{6,7,3}
Coxeter diagram	
Cells	{6,7}
Faces	{6}
Vertex figure	{7,3}
Dual	{3,7,6}
Coxeter group	[6,7,3]
Properties	Regular

In the geometry of hyperbolic 3-space, the order-7-3 hexagonal honeycomb (or 6,7,3 honeycomb) a regular space-filling tessellation (or honeycomb). Each infinite cell consists of an order-6 hexagonal tiling whose vertices lie on a 2-hypercycle, each of which has a limiting circle on the ideal sphere.

The Schläfli symbol of the order-7-3 hexagonal honeycomb is {6,7,3}, with three order-5 hexagonal tilings meeting at each edge. The vertex figure of this honeycomb is a heptagonal tiling, {7,3}.

Poincaré disk model	Ideal surface

=== Order-7-3 apeirogonal honeycomb ===
Order-7-3 apeirogonal honeycomb
Type	Regular honeycomb
Schläfli symbol	{∞,7,3}
Coxeter diagram	
Cells	{∞,7}
Faces	Apeirogon {∞}
Vertex figure	{7,3}
Dual	{3,7,∞}
Coxeter group	[∞,7,3]
Properties	Regular

In the geometry of hyperbolic 3-space, the order-7-3 apeirogonal honeycomb (or ∞,7,3 honeycomb) a regular space-filling tessellation (or honeycomb). Each infinite cell consists of an order-7 apeirogonal tiling whose vertices lie on a 2-hypercycle, each of which has a limiting circle on the ideal sphere.

The Schläfli symbol of the apeirogonal tiling honeycomb is {∞,7,3}, with three order-7 apeirogonal tilings meeting at each edge. The vertex figure of this honeycomb is a heptagonal tiling, {7,3}.

The "ideal surface" projection below is a plane-at-infinity, in the Poincaré half-space model of H3. It shows an Apollonian gasket pattern of circles inside a largest circle.

Poincaré disk model	Ideal surface

=== Order-7-4 square honeycomb ===
Order-7-4 square honeycomb
Type	Regular honeycomb
Schläfli symbol	{4,7,4}
Coxeter diagrams	=
Cells	{4,7}
Faces	{4}
Edge figure	{4}
Vertex figure	{7,4}
Dual	self-dual
Coxeter group	[4,7,4]
Properties	Regular

In the geometry of hyperbolic 3-space, the order-7-4 square honeycomb (or 4,7,4 honeycomb) a regular space-filling tessellation (or honeycomb) with Schläfli symbol {4,7,4}.

All vertices are ultra-ideal (existing beyond the ideal boundary) with four order-5 square tilings existing around each edge and with an order-4 heptagonal tiling vertex figure.

Poincaré disk model	Ideal surface

=== Order-7-5 pentagonal honeycomb ===
Order-7-5 pentagonal honeycomb
Type	Regular honeycomb
Schläfli symbol	{5,7,5}
Coxeter diagrams	
Cells	{5,7}
Faces	{5}
Edge figure	{5}
Vertex figure	{7,5}
Dual	self-dual
Coxeter group	[5,7,5]
Properties	Regular

In the geometry of hyperbolic 3-space, the order-7-5 pentagonal honeycomb (or 5,7,5 honeycomb) a regular space-filling tessellation (or honeycomb) with Schläfli symbol {5,7,5}.

All vertices are ultra-ideal (existing beyond the ideal boundary) with five order-7 pentagonal tilings existing around each edge and with an order-5 heptagonal tiling vertex figure.

Poincaré disk model	Ideal surface

=== Order-7-6 hexagonal honeycomb ===
Order-7-6 hexagonal honeycomb
Type	Regular honeycomb
Schläfli symbols	{6,7,6} {6,(7,3,7)}
Coxeter diagrams	=
Cells	{6,7}
Faces	{6}
Edge figure	{6}
Vertex figure	{7,6} {(5,3,5)}
Dual	self-dual
Coxeter group	[6,7,6] [6,((7,3,7))]
Properties	Regular

In the geometry of hyperbolic 3-space, the order-7-6 hexagonal honeycomb (or 6,7,6 honeycomb) is a regular space-filling tessellation (or honeycomb) with Schläfli symbol {6,7,6}. It has six order-7 hexagonal tilings, {6,7}, around each edge. All vertices are ultra-ideal (existing beyond the ideal boundary) with infinitely many hexagonal tilings existing around each vertex in an order-6 heptagonal tiling vertex arrangement.

Poincaré disk model	Ideal surface

It has a second construction as a uniform honeycomb, Schläfli symbol {6,(7,3,7)}, Coxeter diagram,, with alternating types or colors of cells. In Coxeter notation the half symmetry is [6,7,6,1^{+}] = [6,((7,3,7))].

=== Order-7-infinite apeirogonal honeycomb ===
Order-7-infinite apeirogonal honeycomb
Type	Regular honeycomb
Schläfli symbols	{∞,7,∞} {∞,(7,∞,7)}
Coxeter diagrams	↔
Cells	{∞,7}
Faces	{∞}
Edge figure	{∞}
Vertex figure	{7,∞} {(7,∞,7)}
Dual	self-dual
Coxeter group	[∞,7,∞] [∞,((7,∞,7))]
Properties	Regular

In the geometry of hyperbolic 3-space, the order-7-infinite apeirogonal honeycomb (or ∞,7,∞ honeycomb) is a regular space-filling tessellation (or honeycomb) with Schläfli symbol {∞,7,∞}. It has infinitely many order-7 apeirogonal tiling {∞,7} around each edge. All vertices are ultra-ideal (existing beyond the ideal boundary) with infinitely many order-7 apeirogonal tilings existing around each vertex in an infinite-order heptagonal tiling vertex figure.

Poincaré disk model	Ideal surface

It has a second construction as a uniform honeycomb, Schläfli symbol {∞,(7,∞,7)}, Coxeter diagram,, with alternating types or colors of cells.

== See also ==
- Convex uniform honeycombs in hyperbolic space
- List of regular polytopes
