= List of regular polytopes =

Selected regular polytopes
Regular (2D) polygons
Convex	Star
{5}	{5/2}
Regular (3D) polyhedra
Convex	Star
{5,3}	{5/2,5}
Regular 4D polytopes
Convex	Star
{5,3,3}	{5/2,5,3}
Regular 2D tessellations
Euclidean	Hyperbolic
{4,4}	{5,4}
Regular 3D tessellations
Euclidean	Hyperbolic
{4,3,4}	{5,3,4}

This article lists the regular polytopes in Euclidean, spherical and hyperbolic spaces.

== Overview ==
This table shows a summary of regular polytope counts by rank.

Rank	Finite						Infinite							
Rank	Euclidean / Spherical					Abstract	Euclidean				Hyperbolic			Abstract
Rank	Euclidean / Spherical					Abstract	Euclidean				Compact		Paracompact	Abstract
Rank	Convex	Star	Skew			Abstract	Convex	Skew			Convex	Star	Convex	Abstract
Rank	Convex	Star	d = r	d = r+1	d = r+2	Abstract	Convex	d = r-1	d = r	d = r+1	Convex	Star	Convex	Abstract
1	1	0	0	0	0	1	0	0	0	0	0	0	0	0
2	∞	∞	0	∞	∞	∞	1	0	1	∞	1	0	0	1
3	5	4	9	∞	∞	∞	3	3	24	∞	∞	∞	∞	∞
4	6	10	18	?	∞	∞	1	7	?	∞	4	0	11	∞
5	3	0	3	?	∞	∞	3	15	?	∞	5	4	2	∞
6	3	0	3	?	∞	∞	1	7	?	∞	0	0	5	∞
7+	3	0	3	?	∞	∞	1	7	?	∞	0	0	0	∞

== 1-polytopes ==
A Coxeter diagram represent mirror "planes" as nodes, and puts a ring around a node if a point is not on the plane. A dion { },, is a point p and its mirror image point p', and the line segment between them.

There is only one polytope of rank 1 (1-polytope), the closed line segment bounded by its two endpoints. Every realization of this 1-polytope is regular. It has the Schläfli symbol { }, or a Coxeter diagram with a single ringed node,. Norman Johnson calls it a dion and gives it the Schläfli symbol { }.

Although trivial as a polytope, it appears as the edges of polygons and other higher dimensional polytopes. It is used in the definition of uniform prisms like Schläfli symbol { }×{p}, or Coxeter diagram as a Cartesian product of a line segment and a regular polygon.

== 2-polytopes (polygons) ==
The polytopes of rank 2 (2-polytopes) are called polygons. Regular polygons are equilateral and cyclic. A p-gonal regular polygon is represented by Schläfli symbol {p}.

Many sources only consider convex polygons, but star polygons, like the pentagram, when considered, can also be regular. They use the same vertices as the convex forms, but connect in an alternate connectivity which passes around the circle more than once to be completed.

=== Convex ===
The Schläfli symbol {p} represents a regular p-gon.

Name	Triangle (2-simplex)	Square (2-orthoplex) (2-cube)	Pentagon (2-pentagonal polytope)	Hexagon	Heptagon	Octagon	
Schläfli	{3}	{4}	{5}	{6}	{7}	{8}	
Symmetry	D_{3}, [3]	D_{4}, [4]	D_{5}, [5]	D_{6}, [6]	D_{7}, [7]	D_{8}, [8]	
Coxeter							
Image							
Name	Nonagon (Enneagon)	Decagon	Hendecagon	Dodecagon	Tridecagon	Tetradecagon	
Schläfli	{9}	{10}	{11}	{12}	{13}	{14}	
Symmetry	D_{9}, [9]	D_{10}, [10]	D_{11}, [11]	D_{12}, [12]	D_{13}, [13]	D_{14}, [14]	
Coxeter							
Image							
Name	Pentadecagon	Hexadecagon	Heptadecagon	Octadecagon	Enneadecagon	Icosagon	p-gon
Schläfli	{15}	{16}	{17}	{18}	{19}	{20}	{p}
Symmetry	D_{15}, [15]	D_{16}, [16]	D_{17}, [17]	D_{18}, [18]	D_{19}, [19]	D_{20}, [20]	D_{p}, [p]
Coxeter							
Image							

==== Spherical ====
The regular digon {2} can be considered to be a degenerate regular polygon. It can be realized non-degenerately in some non-Euclidean spaces, such as on the surface of a sphere or torus. For example, digon can be realised non-degenerately as a spherical lune. A monogon {1} could also be realised on the sphere as a single point with a great circle through it. However, a monogon is not a valid abstract polytope because its single edge is incident to only one vertex rather than two.

Name	Monogon	Digon
Schläfli symbol	{1}	{2}
Symmetry	D_{1}, [ ]	D_{2}, [2]
Coxeter diagram	or	
Image		

=== Stars ===
There exist infinitely many regular star polytopes in two dimensions, whose Schläfli symbols consist of rational numbers {n/m}. They are called star polygons and share the same vertex arrangements of the convex regular polygons.

In general, for any natural number n, there are regular n-pointed stars with Schläfli symbols {n/m} for all m such that m < n/2 (strictly speaking {n/m} = {n/(n − m)}) and m and n are coprime (as such, all stellations of a polygon with a prime number of sides will be regular stars). Symbols where m and n are not coprime may be used to represent compound polygons.

Name	Pentagram	Heptagrams		Octagram	Enneagrams		Decagram	...n-grams
Schläfli	{5/2}	{7/2}	{7/3}	{8/3}	{9/2}	{9/4}	{10/3}	{p/q}
Symmetry	D_{5}, [5]	D_{7}, [7]		D_{8}, [8]	D_{9}, [9],		D_{10}, [10]	D_{p}, [p]
Coxeter								
Image								

Regular star polygons up to 20 sides
{11/2}	{11/3}	{11/4}	{11/5}	{12/5}	{13/2}	{13/3}	{13/4}	{13/5}	{13/6}	
{14/3}	{14/5}	{15/2}	{15/4}	{15/7}	{16/3}	{16/5}	{16/7}			
{17/2}	{17/3}	{17/4}	{17/5}	{17/6}	{17/7}	{17/8}	{18/5}	{18/7}		
{19/2}	{19/3}	{19/4}	{19/5}	{19/6}	{19/7}	{19/8}	{19/9}	{20/3}	{20/7}	{20/9}

Star polygons that can only exist as spherical tilings, similarly to the monogon and digon, may exist (for example: {3/2}, {5/3}, {5/4}, {7/4}, {9/5}), however these have not been studied in detail.

There also exist failed star polygons, such as the piangle, which do not cover the surface of a circle finitely many times.

=== Skew polygons ===
In addition to the planar regular polygons there are infinitely many regular skew polygons. Skew polygons can be created via the blending operation.

The blend of two polygons P and Q, written P#Q, can be constructed as follows:

1. take the cartesian product of their vertices V_{P} × V_{Q}.
2. add edges (p_{0} × q_{0}, p_{1} × q_{1}) where (p_{0}, p_{1}) is an edge of P and (q_{0}, q_{1}) is an edge of Q.
3. select an arbitrary connected component of the result.

Alternatively, the blend is the polygon ⟨ρ_{0}σ_{0}, ρ_{1}σ_{1}⟩ where ρ and σ are the generating mirrors of P and Q placed in orthogonal subspaces. The blending operation is commutative, associative and idempotent.

Every regular skew polygon can be expressed as the blend of a unique (Note: (up to identity and idempotency)) set of planar polygons. If P and Q share no factors then Dim(P#Q) = Dim(P) + Dim(Q).

==== In 3 space ====
The regular finite polygons in 3 dimensions are exactly the blends of the planar polygons (dimension 2) with the digon (dimension 1). They have vertices corresponding to a prism ({n/m}#{} where n is odd) or an antiprism ({n/m}#{} where n is even). All polygons in 3 space have an even number of vertices and edges.

Several of these appear as the Petrie polygons of regular polyhedra.

==== In 4 space ====
The regular finite polygons in 4 dimensions are exactly the polygons formed as a blend of two distinct planar polygons. They have vertices lying on a Clifford torus and related by a Clifford displacement. Unlike 3-dimensional polygons, skew polygons on double rotations can include an odd-number of sides.

== 3-polytopes (polyhedra) ==
Polytopes of dimension 3 are called polyhedra:

A regular polyhedron with Schläfli symbol {p, q}, Coxeter diagrams, has a regular face type {p}, and regular vertex figure {q}.

A vertex figure (of a polyhedron) is a polygon, seen by connecting those vertices which are one edge away from a given vertex. For regular polyhedra, this vertex figure is always a regular (and planar) polygon.

Existence of a regular polyhedron {p, q} is constrained by an inequality, related to the vertex figure's angle defect:
$$\begin{align}
& \frac{1}{p} + \frac{1}{q} > \frac{1}{2} : \text{Polyhedron (existing in Euclidean 3-space)} \\[6pt]
& \frac{1}{p} + \frac{1}{q} = \frac{1}{2} : \text{Euclidean plane tiling} \\[6pt]
& \frac{1}{p} + \frac{1}{q} < \frac{1}{2} : \text{Hyperbolic plane tiling}
\end{align}$$

By enumerating the permutations, we find five convex forms, four star forms and three plane tilings, all with polygons {p} and {q} limited to: {3}, {4}, {5}, {5/2}, and {6}.

Beyond Euclidean space, there is an infinite set of regular hyperbolic tilings.

=== Convex ===
The five convex regular polyhedra are called the Platonic solids. The vertex figure is given with each vertex count. All these polyhedra have an Euler characteristic ($\chi$) of 2.

Name	Schläfli {p, q}	Coxeter	Image (solid)	Image (sphere)	Faces {p}	Edges	Vertices {q}	Symmetry	Dual
Tetrahedron (3-simplex)	{3,3}				4 {3}	6	4 {3}	T_{d} [3,3] (*332)	(self)
Hexahedron; Cube (3-cube)	{4,3}				6 {4}	12	8 {3}	O_{h} [4,3] (*432)	Octahedron
Octahedron (3-orthoplex)	{3,4}				8 {3}	12	6 {4}	O_{h} [4,3] (*432)	Cube
Dodecahedron	{5,3}				12 {5}	30	20 {3}	I_{h} [5,3] (*532)	Icosahedron
Icosahedron	{3,5}				20 {3}	30	12 {5}	I_{h} [5,3] (*532)	Dodecahedron

==== Spherical ====
In spherical geometry, regular spherical polyhedra (tilings of the sphere) exist that would otherwise be degenerate as polytopes. These are the hosohedra {2,n} and their dual dihedra {n,2}. Coxeter calls these cases "improper" tessellations.

The first few cases (n from 2 to 6) are listed below.

Hosohedra
Name	Schläfli {2,p}	Coxeter diagram	Image (sphere)	Faces {2}_{π/p}	Edges	Vertices {p}	Symmetry	Dual
Digonal hosohedron	{2,2}			2 {2}_{π/2}	2	2 {2}_{π/2}	D_{2h} [2,2] (*222)	Self
Trigonal hosohedron	{2,3}			3 {2}_{π/3}	3	2 {3}	D_{3h} [2,3] (*322)	Trigonal dihedron
Square hosohedron	{2,4}			4 {2}_{π/4}	4	2 {4}	D_{4h} [2,4] (*422)	Square dihedron
Pentagonal hosohedron	{2,5}			5 {2}_{π/5}	5	2 {5}	D_{5h} [2,5] (*522)	Pentagonal dihedron
Hexagonal hosohedron	{2,6}			6 {2}_{π/6}	6	2 {6}	D_{6h} [2,6] (*622)	Hexagonal dihedron

Dihedra
Name	Schläfli {p,2}	Coxeter diagram	Image (sphere)	Faces {p}	Edges	Vertices {2}	Symmetry	Dual
Digonal dihedron	{2,2}			2 {2}_{π/2}	2	2 {2}_{π/2}	D_{2h} [2,2] (*222)	Self
Trigonal dihedron	{3,2}			2 {3}	3	3 {2}_{π/3}	D_{3h} [3,2] (*322)	Trigonal hosohedron
Square dihedron	{4,2}			2 {4}	4	4 {2}_{π/4}	D_{4h} [4,2] (*422)	Square hosohedron
Pentagonal dihedron	{5,2}			2 {5}	5	5 {2}_{π/5}	D_{5h} [5,2] (*522)	Pentagonal hosohedron
Hexagonal dihedron	{6,2}			2 {6}	6	6 {2}_{π/6}	D_{6h} [6,2] (*622)	Hexagonal hosohedron

Star-dihedra and hosohedra {p/q, 2} and {2, p/q} also exist for any star polygon {p/q}.

=== Stars ===
The regular star polyhedra are called the Kepler–Poinsot polyhedra and there are four of them, based on the vertex arrangements of the dodecahedron {5,3} and icosahedron {3,5}:

As spherical tilings, these star forms overlap the sphere multiple times, called its density, being 3 or 7 for these forms. The tiling images show a single spherical polygon face in yellow.

Name	Image (skeletonic)	Image (solid)	Image (sphere)	Stellation diagram	Schläfli {p, q} and Coxeter	Faces {p}	Edges	Vertices {q} verf.	χ	Density	Symmetry	Dual
Small stellated dodecahedron					{5/2,5}	12 {5/2}	30	12 {5}	−6	3	I_{h} [5,3] (*532)	Great dodecahedron
Great dodecahedron					{5,5/2}	12 {5}	30	12 {5/2}	−6	3	I_{h} [5,3] (*532)	Small stellated dodecahedron
Great stellated dodecahedron					{5/2,3}	12 {5/2}	30	20 {3}	2	7	I_{h} [5,3] (*532)	Great icosahedron
Great icosahedron					{3,5/2}	20 {3}	30	12 {5/2}	2	7	I_{h} [5,3] (*532)	Great stellated dodecahedron

There are infinitely many failed star polyhedra. These are also spherical tilings with star polygons in their Schläfli symbols, but they do not cover a sphere finitely many times. Some examples are {5/2,4}, {5/2,9}, {7/2,3}, {5/2,5/2}, {7/2,7/3}, {4,5/2}, and {3,7/3}.

=== Skew polyhedra ===
Regular skew polyhedra are generalizations to the set of regular polyhedron which include the possibility of nonplanar vertex figures.

For 4-dimensional skew polyhedra, Coxeter offered a modified Schläfli symbol {l,m|n} for these figures, with {l,m} implying the vertex figure, m l-gons around a vertex, and n-gonal holes. Their vertex figures are skew polygons, zig-zagging between two planes.

The regular skew polyhedra, represented by {l,m|n}, follow this equation:

$$2 \sin\left(\frac{\pi}{l}\right) \sin\left(\frac{\pi}{m}\right) = \cos\left(\frac{\pi}{n}\right)$$

Four of them can be seen in 4-dimensions as a subset of faces of four regular 4-polytopes, sharing the same vertex arrangement and edge arrangement:

{4, 6 | 3}	{6, 4 | 3}	{4, 8 | 3}	{8, 4 | 3}

== 4-polytopes (polychora) ==
Regular 4-polytopes with Schläfli symbol $\{p,q,r\}$ have cells of type $\{p,q\}$, faces of type $\{p\}$, edge figures $\{r\}$, and vertex figures $\{q,r\}$.

- A vertex figure (of a 4-polytope) is a polyhedron, seen by the arrangement of neighboring vertices around a given vertex. For regular 4-polytopes, this vertex figure is a regular polyhedron.
- An edge figure is a polygon, seen by the arrangement of faces around an edge. For regular 4-polytopes, this edge figure will always be a regular polygon.

The existence of a regular 4-polytope $\{p,q,r\}$ is constrained by the existence of the regular polyhedra $\{p,q\}, \{q,r\}$. A suggested name for 4-polytopes is "polychoron".

Each will exist in a space dependent upon this expression:

$\sin \left ( \frac{\pi}{p} \right ) \sin \left(\frac{\pi}{r}\right) - \cos\left(\frac{\pi}{q}\right)$

$> 0$ : Hyperspherical 3-space honeycomb or 4-polytope
$= 0$ : Euclidean 3-space honeycomb
$< 0$ : Hyperbolic 3-space honeycomb

These constraints allow for 21 forms: 6 are convex, 10 are nonconvex, one is a Euclidean 3-space honeycomb, and 4 are hyperbolic honeycombs.

=== Convex ===
The 6 convex regular 4-polytopes are shown in the table below. All these 4-polytopes have an Euler characteristic ($\chi$) of 0.

Name	Schläfli {p,q,r}	Coxeter	Cells {p,q}	Faces {p}	Edges {r}	Vertices {q,r}	Dual {r,q,p}
5-cell (4-simplex)	{3,3,3}		5 {3,3}	10 {3}	10 {3}	5 {3,3}	(self)
8-cell (4-cube) (Tesseract)	{4,3,3}		8 {4,3}	24 {4}	32 {3}	16 {3,3}	16-cell
16-cell (4-orthoplex)	{3,3,4}		16 {3,3}	32 {3}	24 {4}	8 {3,4}	Tesseract
24-cell	{3,4,3}		24 {3,4}	96 {3}	96 {3}	24 {4,3}	(self)
120-cell	{5,3,3}		120 {5,3}	720 {5}	1200 {3}	600 {3,3}	600-cell
600-cell	{3,3,5}		600 {3,3}	1200 {3}	720 {5}	120 {3,5}	120-cell

5-cell	8-cell	16-cell	24-cell	120-cell	600-cell
{3,3,3}	{4,3,3}	{3,3,4}	{3,4,3}	{5,3,3}	{3,3,5}
Wireframe (Petrie polygon) skew orthographic projections
Solid orthographic projections
tetrahedral envelope (cell/ vertex-centered)	cubic envelope (cell-centered)	cubic envelope (cell-centered)	cuboctahedral envelope (cell-centered)	truncated rhombic triacontahedron envelope (cell-centered)	Pentakis icosidodecahedral envelope (vertex-centered)
Wireframe Schlegel diagrams (Perspective projection)
(cell-centered)	(cell-centered)	(cell-centered)	(cell-centered)	(cell-centered)	(vertex-centered)
Wireframe stereographic projections (Hyperspherical)

==== Spherical ====
Di-4-topes and hoso-4-topes exist as regular tessellations of the 3-sphere.

Regular di-4-topes (2 facets) include: {3,3,2}, {3,4,2}, {4,3,2}, {5,3,2}, {3,5,2}, {p,2,2}, and their hoso-4-tope duals (2 vertices): {2,3,3}, {2,4,3}, {2,3,4}, {2,3,5}, {2,5,3}, {2,2,p}. 4-polytopes of the form {2,p,2} are the same as {2,2,p}. There are also the cases {p,2,q} which have dihedral cells and hosohedral vertex figures.

Regular hoso-4-topes as 3-sphere honeycombs
Schläfli {2,p,q}	Coxeter	Cells {2,p}_{π/q}	Faces {2}_{π/p,π/q}	Edges	Vertices	Vertex figure {p,q}	Symmetry	Dual
{2,3,3}		4 {2,3}_{π/3}	6 {2}_{π/3,π/3}	4	2	{3,3}	[2,3,3]	{3,3,2}
{2,4,3}		6 {2,4}_{π/3}	12 {2}_{π/4,π/3}	8	2	{4,3}	[2,4,3]	{3,4,2}
{2,3,4}		8 {2,3}_{π/4}	12 {2}_{π/3,π/4}	6	2	{3,4}	[2,4,3]	{4,3,2}
{2,5,3}		12 {2,5}_{π/3}	30 {2}_{π/5,π/3}	20	2	{5,3}	[2,5,3]	{3,5,2}
{2,3,5}		20 {2,3}_{π/5}	30 {2}_{π/3,π/5}	12	2	{3,5}	[2,5,3]	{5,3,2}

=== Stars ===
There are ten regular star 4-polytopes, which are called the Schläfli–Hess 4-polytopes. Their vertices are based on the convex 120-cell {5,3,3} and 600-cell {3,3,5}.

Ludwig Schläfli found four of them and skipped the last six because he would not allow forms that failed the Euler characteristic on cells or vertex figures (for zero-hole tori: F+V−E=2). Edmund Hess (1843–1903) completed the full list of ten in his German book Einleitung in die Lehre von der Kugelteilung mit besonderer Berücksichtigung ihrer Anwendung auf die Theorie der Gleichflächigen und der gleicheckigen Polyeder (1883).

There are 4 unique edge arrangements and 7 unique face arrangements from these 10 regular star 4-polytopes, shown as orthogonal projections:

Name	Wireframe	Solid	Schläfli {p, q, r} Coxeter	Cells {p, q}	Faces {p}	Edges {r}	Vertices {q, r}	Density	χ	Symmetry group	Dual {r, q,p}
Icosahedral 120-cell (faceted 600-cell)			{3,5,5/2}	120 {3,5}	1200 {3}	720 {5/2}	120 {5,5/2}	4	480	H_{4} [5,3,3]	Small stellated 120-cell
Small stellated 120-cell			{5/2,5,3}	120 {5/2,5}	720 {5/2}	1200 {3}	120 {5,3}	4	−480	H_{4} [5,3,3]	Icosahedral 120-cell
Great 120-cell			{5,5/2,5}	120 {5,5/2}	720 {5}	720 {5}	120 {5/2,5}	6	0	H_{4} [5,3,3]	Self-dual
Grand 120-cell			{5,3,5/2}	120 {5,3}	720 {5}	720 {5/2}	120 {3,5/2}	20	0	H_{4} [5,3,3]	Great stellated 120-cell
Great stellated 120-cell			{5/2,3,5}	120 {5/2,3}	720 {5/2}	720 {5}	120 {3,5}	20	0	H_{4} [5,3,3]	Grand 120-cell
Grand stellated 120-cell			{5/2,5,5/2}	120 {5/2,5}	720 {5/2}	720 {5/2}	120 {5,5/2}	66	0	H_{4} [5,3,3]	Self-dual
Great grand 120-cell			{5,5/2,3}	120 {5,5/2}	720 {5}	1200 {3}	120 {5/2,3}	76	−480	H_{4} [5,3,3]	Great icosahedral 120-cell
Great icosahedral 120-cell (great faceted 600-cell)			{3,5/2,5}	120 {3,5/2}	1200 {3}	720 {5}	120 {5/2,5}	76	480	H_{4} [5,3,3]	Great grand 120-cell
Grand 600-cell			{3,3,5/2}	600 {3,3}	1200 {3}	720 {5/2}	120 {3,5/2}	191	0	H_{4} [5,3,3]	Great grand stellated 120-cell
Great grand stellated 120-cell			{5/2,3,3}	120 {5/2,3}	720 {5/2}	1200 {3}	600 {3,3}	191	0	H_{4} [5,3,3]	Grand 600-cell

There are 4 failed potential regular star 4-polytopes permutations: {3,5/2,3}, {4,3,5/2}, {5/2,3,4}, {5/2,3,5/2}. Their cells and vertex figures exist, but they do not cover a hypersphere with a finite number of repetitions.

=== Skew 4-polytopes ===
In addition to the 16 planar 4-polytopes above there are 18 finite skew polytopes. One of these is obtained as the Petrie dual of the tesseract, and the other 17 can be formed by applying the kappa operation to the planar polytopes and the Petrie dual of the tesseract.

== Dimension 5 and higher ==
5-polytopes can be given the symbol $\{p,q,r,s\}$ where $\{p,q,r\}$ is the 4-face type, $\{p,q\}$ is the cell type, $\{p\}$ is the face type, and $\{s\}$ is the face figure, $\{r,s\}$ is the edge figure, and $\{q,r,s\}$ is the vertex figure.

A vertex figure (of a 5-polytope) is a 4-polytope, seen by the arrangement of neighboring vertices to each vertex.
An edge figure (of a 5-polytope) is a polyhedron, seen by the arrangement of faces around each edge.
A face figure (of a 5-polytope) is a polygon, seen by the arrangement of cells around each face.

A regular 5-polytope $\{p,q,r,s\}$ exists only if $\{p,q,r\}$ and $\{q,r,s\}$ are regular 4-polytopes.

The space it fits in is based on the expression:

$\frac{\cos^2\left(\frac{\pi}{q}\right)}{\sin^2\left(\frac{\pi}{p}\right)} + \frac{\cos^2\left(\frac{\pi}{r}\right)}{\sin^2\left(\frac{\pi}{s}\right)}$

$< 1$ : Spherical 4-space tessellation or 5-space polytope
$= 1$ : Euclidean 4-space tessellation
$> 1$ : hyperbolic 4-space tessellation

Enumeration of these constraints produce 3 convex polytopes, no star polytopes, 3 tessellations of Euclidean 4-space, and 5 tessellations of paracompact hyperbolic 4-space. The only non-convex regular polytopes for ranks 5 and higher are skews.

=== Convex ===
In dimensions 5 and higher, there are only three kinds of convex regular polytopes.

Name	Schläfli Symbol {p_{1},...,p_{n−1}}	Coxeter	k-faces	Facet type	Vertex figure	Dual
n-simplex	{3^{n−1}}	...	${{n+1} \choose {k+1}}$	{3^{n−2}}	{3^{n−2}}	Self-dual
n-cube	{4,3^{n−2}}	...	$2^{n-k}{n \choose k}$	{4,3^{n−3}}	{3^{n−2}}	n-orthoplex
n-orthoplex	{3^{n−2},4}	...	$2^{k+1}{n \choose {k+1}}$	{3^{n−2}}	{3^{n−3},4}	n-cube

There are also improper cases where some numbers in the Schläfli symbol are 2. For example, {p,q,r,...2} is an improper regular spherical polytope whenever {p,q,r...} is a regular spherical polytope, and {2,...p,q,r} is an improper regular spherical polytope whenever {...p,q,r} is a regular spherical polytope. Such polytopes may also be used as facets, yielding forms such as {p,q,...2...y,z}.

==== 5 dimensions ====
Name	Schläfli Symbol {p,q,r,s} Coxeter	Facets {p,q,r}	Cells {p,q}	Faces {p}	Edges	Vertices	Face figure {s}	Edge figure {r,s}	Vertex figure {q,r,s}
5-simplex	{3,3,3,3}	6 {3,3,3}	15 {3,3}	20 {3}	15	6	{3}	{3,3}	{3,3,3}
5-cube	{4,3,3,3}	10 {4,3,3}	40 {4,3}	80 {4}	80	32	{3}	{3,3}	{3,3,3}
5-orthoplex	{3,3,3,4}	32 {3,3,3}	80 {3,3}	80 {3}	40	10	{4}	{3,4}	{3,3,4}

5-simplex	5-cube	5-orthoplex

==== 6 dimensions ====
Name	Schläfli	Vertices	Edges	Faces	Cells	4-faces	5-faces	χ
6-simplex	{3,3,3,3,3}	7	21	35	35	21	7	0
6-cube	{4,3,3,3,3}	64	192	240	160	60	12	0
6-orthoplex	{3,3,3,3,4}	12	60	160	240	192	64	0

6-simplex	6-cube	6-orthoplex

==== 7 dimensions ====
Name	Schläfli	Vertices	Edges	Faces	Cells	4-faces	5-faces	6-faces	χ
7-simplex	{3,3,3,3,3,3}	8	28	56	70	56	28	8	2
7-cube	{4,3,3,3,3,3}	128	448	672	560	280	84	14	2
7-orthoplex	{3,3,3,3,3,4}	14	84	280	560	672	448	128	2

7-simplex	7-cube	7-orthoplex

==== 8 dimensions ====
Name	Schläfli	Vertices	Edges	Faces	Cells	4-faces	5-faces	6-faces	7-faces	χ
8-simplex	{3,3,3,3,3,3,3}	9	36	84	126	126	84	36	9	0
8-cube	{4,3,3,3,3,3,3}	256	1024	1792	1792	1120	448	112	16	0
8-orthoplex	{3,3,3,3,3,3,4}	16	112	448	1120	1792	1792	1024	256	0

8-simplex	8-cube	8-orthoplex

==== 9 dimensions ====
Name	Schläfli	Vertices	Edges	Faces	Cells	4-faces	5-faces	6-faces	7-faces	8-faces	χ
9-simplex	{3^{8}}	10	45	120	210	252	210	120	45	10	2
9-cube	{4,3^{7}}	512	2304	4608	5376	4032	2016	672	144	18	2
9-orthoplex	{3^{7},4}	18	144	672	2016	4032	5376	4608	2304	512	2

9-simplex	9-cube	9-orthoplex

==== 10 dimensions ====
Name	Schläfli	Vertices	Edges	Faces	Cells	4-faces	5-faces	6-faces	7-faces	8-faces	9-faces	χ
10-simplex	{3^{9}}	11	55	165	330	462	462	330	165	55	11	0
10-cube	{4,3^{8}}	1024	5120	11520	15360	13440	8064	3360	960	180	20	0
10-orthoplex	{3^{8},4}	20	180	960	3360	8064	13440	15360	11520	5120	1024	0

10-simplex	10-cube	10-orthoplex

=== Star polytopes ===
There are no regular star polytopes of rank 5 or higher, with the exception of degenerate polytopes created by the star product of lower rank star polytopes, e.g. hosotopes and ditopes.

== Regular projective polytopes ==
A projective regular (n+1)-polytope exists when an original regular n-spherical tessellation, {p,q,...}, is centrally symmetric. Such a polytope is named hemi-{p,q,...}, and contain half as many elements. Coxeter gives a symbol {p,q,...}/2, while McMullen writes {p,q,...}_{h/2} with h as the coxeter number.

Even-sided regular polygons have hemi-2n-gon projective polygons, {2p}/2.

There are 4 regular projective polyhedra related to 4 of 5 Platonic solids.

The hemi-cube and hemi-octahedron generalize as hemi-n-cubes and hemi-n-orthoplexes to any rank.

=== Regular projective polyhedra ===
Rank 3 regular hemi-polytopes
Name	Coxeter McMullen	Image	Faces	Edges	Vertices	χ	skeleton graph
Hemi-cube	{4,3}/2 {4,3}_{3}		3	6	4	1	K_{4}
Hemi-octahedron	{3,4}/2 {3,4}_{3}		4	6	3	1	Double-edged K_{3}
Hemi-dodecahedron	{5,3}/2 {5,3}_{5}		6	15	10	1	G(5,2)
Hemi-icosahedron	{3,5}/2 {3,5}_{5}		10	15	6	1	K_{6}

=== Regular projective 4-polytopes ===
5 of 6 convex regular 4-polytopes are centrally symmetric generating projective 4-polytopes. The 3 special cases are hemi-24-cell, hemi-600-cell, and hemi-120-cell.

Rank 4 regular hemi-polytopes
Name	Coxeter symbol	McMullen Symbol	Cells	Faces	Edges	Vertices	χ	Skeleton graph
Hemitesseract	{4,3,3}/2	{4,3,3}_{4}	4	12	16	8	0	K_{4,4}
Hemi-16-cell	{3,3,4}/2	{3,3,4}_{4}	8	16	12	4	0	double-edged K_{4}
Hemi-24-cell	{3,4,3}/2	{3,4,3}_{6}	12	48	48	12	0	
Hemi-120-cell	{5,3,3}/2	{5,3,3}_{15}	60	360	600	300	0	
Hemi-600-cell	{3,3,5}/2	{3,3,5}_{15}	300	600	360	60	0	

=== Regular projective 5-polytopes ===
Only 2 of 3 regular spherical polytopes are centrally symmetric for ranks 5 or higher. The corresponding regular projective polytopes are the hemi versions of the regular hypercube and orthoplex. They are tabulated below for rank 5, for example:

Name	Schläfli	4-faces	Cells	Faces	Edges	Vertices	χ	Skeleton graph
hemi-penteract	{4,3,3,3}/2	5	20	40	40	16	1	Tesseract skeleton + 8 central diagonals
hemi-pentacross	{3,3,3,4}/2	16	40	40	20	5	1	double-edged K_{5}

== Apeirotopes ==
An apeirotope or infinite polytope is a polytope which has infinitely many facets. An n-apeirotope is an infinite n-polytope: a 2-apeirotope or apeirogon is an infinite polygon, a 3-apeirotope or apeirohedron is an infinite polyhedron, etc.

There are two main geometric classes of apeirotope:

- Regular honeycombs in n dimensions, which completely fill an n-dimensional space.
- Regular skew apeirotopes, comprising an n-dimensional manifold in a higher space.

=== 2-apeirotopes (apeirogons) ===
The straight apeirogon is a regular tessellation of the line, subdividing it into infinitely many equal segments. It has infinitely many vertices and edges. Its Schläfli symbol is {∞}, and Coxeter diagram.

... ...

It exists as the limit of the p-gon as p tends to infinity, as follows:

Name	Monogon	Digon	Triangle	Square	Pentagon	Hexagon	Heptagon	p-gon	Apeirogon
Schläfli	{1}	{2}	{3}	{4}	{5}	{6}	{7}	{p}	{∞}
Symmetry	D_{1}, [ ]	D_{2}, [2]	D_{3}, [3]	D_{4}, [4]	D_{5}, [5]	D_{6}, [6]	D_{7}, [7]	[p]	
Coxeter	or								
Image									

Apeirogons in the hyperbolic plane, most notably the regular apeirogon, {∞}, can have a curvature just like finite polygons of the Euclidean plane, with the vertices circumscribed by horocycles or hypercycles rather than circles.

Regular apeirogons that are scaled to converge at infinity have the symbol {∞} and exist on horocycles, while more generally they can exist on hypercycles.

{∞}	{iπ/λ}
Apeirogon on horocycle	Apeirogon on hypercycle

Above are two regular hyperbolic apeirogons in the Poincaré disk model, the right one shows perpendicular reflection lines of divergent fundamental domains, separated by length λ.

==== Skew apeirogons ====
A skew apeirogon in two dimensions forms a zig-zag line in the plane. If the zig-zag is even and symmetrical, then the apeirogon is regular.

Skew apeirogons can be constructed in any number of dimensions. In three dimensions, a regular skew apeirogon traces out a helical spiral and may be either left- or right-handed.

2 dimensions	3 dimensions
Zig-zag apeirogon	Helix apeirogon

=== 3-apeirotopes (apeirohedra) ===
==== Euclidean tilings ====
There are six regular tessellations of the plane: the three listed below, and their corresponding Petrials.

Name	Square tiling (quadrille)	Triangular tiling (deltille)	Hexagonal tiling (hextille)
Symmetry	p4m, [4,4], (*442)	p6m, [6,3], (*632)	
Schläfli {p,q}	{4,4}	{3,6}	{6,3}
Coxeter diagram			
Image			

There are two improper regular tilings: {∞,2}, an apeirogonal dihedron, made from two apeirogons, each filling half the plane; and secondly, its dual, {2,∞}, an apeirogonal hosohedron, seen as an infinite set of parallel lines.

{∞,2},	{2,∞},

==== Euclidean star-tilings ====
There are no regular plane tilings of star polygons. There are many enumerations that fit in the plane (1/p + 1/q = 1/2), like {8/3,8}, {10/3,5}, {5/2,10}, {12/5,12}, etc., but none repeat periodically.

==== Hyperbolic tilings ====
Tessellations of hyperbolic 2-space are hyperbolic tilings. There are infinitely many regular tilings in H^{2}. As stated above, every positive integer pair {p,q} such that 1/p + 1/q < 1/2 gives a hyperbolic tiling. In fact, for the general Schwarz triangle (p, q, r) the same holds true for 1/p + 1/q + 1/r < 1.

There are a number of different ways to display the hyperbolic plane, including the Poincaré disk model which maps the plane into a circle, as shown below. It should be recognized that all of the polygon faces in the tilings below are equal-sized and only appear to get smaller near the edges due to the projection applied, very similar to the effect of a camera fisheye lens.

There are infinitely many flat regular 3-apeirotopes (apeirohedra) as regular tilings of the hyperbolic plane, of the form {p,q}, with p+q<pq/2.

- {3,7}, {3,8}, {3,9} ... {3,∞}
- {4,5}, {4,6}, {4,7} ... {4,∞}
- {5,4}, {5,5}, {5,6} ... {5,∞}
- {6,4}, {6,5}, {6,6} ... {6,∞}
- {7,3}, {7,4}, {7,5} ... {7,∞}
- {8,3}, {8,4}, {8,5} ... {8,∞}
- {9,3}, {9,4}, {9,5} ... {9,∞}
- ...
- {∞,3}, {∞,4}, {∞,5} ... {∞,∞}

A sampling:

Regular hyperbolic tiling table
Spherical (improper/Platonic)/Euclidean/hyperbolic (Poincaré disk: compact/paracompact/noncompact) tessellations with their Schläfli symbol
p \ q	2	3	4	5	6	7	8	...	∞	...	iπ/λ
2	{2,2}	{2,3}	{2,4}	{2,5}	{2,6}	{2,7}	{2,8}	...	{2,∞}	...	{2,iπ/λ}
3	{3,2}	(tetrahedron) {3,3}	(octahedron) {3,4}	(icosahedron) {3,5}	(deltille) {3,6}	{3,7}	{3,8}	...	{3,∞}	...	{3,iπ/λ}
4	{4,2}	(cube) {4,3}	(quadrille) {4,4}	{4,5}	{4,6}	{4,7}	{4,8}	...	{4,∞}	...	{4,iπ/λ}
5	{5,2}	(dodecahedron) {5,3}	{5,4}	{5,5}	{5,6}	{5,7}	{5,8}	...	{5,∞}	...	{5,iπ/λ}
6	{6,2}	(hextille) {6,3}	{6,4}	{6,5}	{6,6}	{6,7}	{6,8}	...	{6,∞}	...	{6,iπ/λ}
7	{7,2}	{7,3}	{7,4}	{7,5}	{7,6}	{7,7}	{7,8}	...	{7,∞}	...	{7,iπ/λ}
8	{8,2}	{8,3}	{8,4}	{8,5}	{8,6}	{8,7}	{8,8}	...	{8,∞}	...	{8,iπ/λ}
...								...		...	
∞	{∞,2}	{∞,3}	{∞,4}	{∞,5}	{∞,6}	{∞,7}	{∞,8}	...	{∞,∞}	...	{∞,iπ/λ}
...								...		...	
iπ/λ	{iπ/λ,2}	{iπ/λ,3}	{iπ/λ,4}	{iπ/λ,5}	{iπ/λ,6}	{iπ/λ,7}	{iπ/λ,8}	...	{iπ/λ,∞}	...	{iπ/λ, iπ/λ}

The tilings {p, ∞} have ideal vertices, on the edge of the Poincaré disk model. Their duals {∞, p} have ideal apeirogonal faces, meaning that they are inscribed in horocycles. One could go further (as is done in the table above) and find tilings with ultra-ideal vertices, outside the Poincaré disk, which are dual to tiles inscribed in hypercycles; in what is symbolised {p, iπ/λ} above, infinitely many tiles still fit around each ultra-ideal vertex. (Parallel lines in extended hyperbolic space meet at an ideal point; ultraparallel lines meet at an ultra-ideal point.)

==== Hyperbolic star-tilings ====
There are 2 infinite forms of hyperbolic tilings whose faces or vertex figures are star polygons: {m/2, m} and their duals {m, m/2} with m = 7, 9, 11, ... The {m/2, m} tilings are stellations of the {m, 3} tilings while the {m, m/2} dual tilings are facetings of the {3, m} tilings and greatenings (Note: In a classification advanced by Conway & adopted by Coxeter, stellation refers to extension of edges, and greatening to extension of faces; the term aggrandizement is given for extension of cells (of polychora), though it appears to be less-commonly used.) of the {m, 3} tilings.

The patterns {m/2, m} and {m, m/2} continue for odd m < 7 as polyhedra: when m = 5, we obtain the small stellated dodecahedron and great dodecahedron, and when m = 3, the case degenerates to a tetrahedron. The other two Kepler–Poinsot polyhedra (the great stellated dodecahedron and great icosahedron) do not have regular hyperbolic tiling analogues. If m is even, depending on how we choose to define {m/2}, we can either obtain degenerate double covers of other tilings or compound tilings.

Name	Schläfli	Coxeter diagram	Image	Face type {p}	Vertex figure {q}	Density	Symmetry	Dual
Order-7 heptagrammic tiling	{7/2,7}			{7/2}	{7}	3	*732 [7,3]	Heptagrammic-order heptagonal tiling
Heptagrammic-order heptagonal tiling	{7,7/2}			{7}	{7/2}	3	*732 [7,3]	Order-7 heptagrammic tiling
Order-9 enneagrammic tiling	{9/2,9}			{9/2}	{9}	3	*932 [9,3]	Enneagrammic-order enneagonal tiling
Enneagrammic-order enneagonal tiling	{9,9/2}			{9}	{9/2}	3	*932 [9,3]	Order-9 enneagrammic tiling
Order-11 hendecagrammic tiling	{11/2,11}			{11/2}	{11}	3	*11.3.2 [11,3]	Hendecagrammic-order hendecagonal tiling
Hendecagrammic-order hendecagonal tiling	{11,11/2}			{11}	{11/2}	3	*11.3.2 [11,3]	Order-11 hendecagrammic tiling
Order-p p-grammic tiling	{p/2,p}			{p/2}	{p}	3	*p32 [p,3]	p-grammic-order p-gonal tiling
p-grammic-order p-gonal tiling	{p,p/2}			{p}	{p/2}	3	*p32 [p,3]	Order-p p-grammic tiling

==== Skew apeirohedra in Euclidean 3-space ====
Some relationships between the 12 pure apeirohedra in 3D Euclidean space: π represents the Petrial; δ represents the dual; η represents halving; φ represents facetting; σ represents skewing; r represents rectification

There are three regular skew apeirohedra in Euclidean 3-space, with planar faces. They share the same vertex arrangement and edge arrangement of 3 convex uniform honeycombs.

- 6 squares around each vertex: {4,6|4}
- 4 hexagons around each vertex: {6,4|4}
- 6 hexagons around each vertex: {6,6|3}
Regular skew polyhedra with planar faces

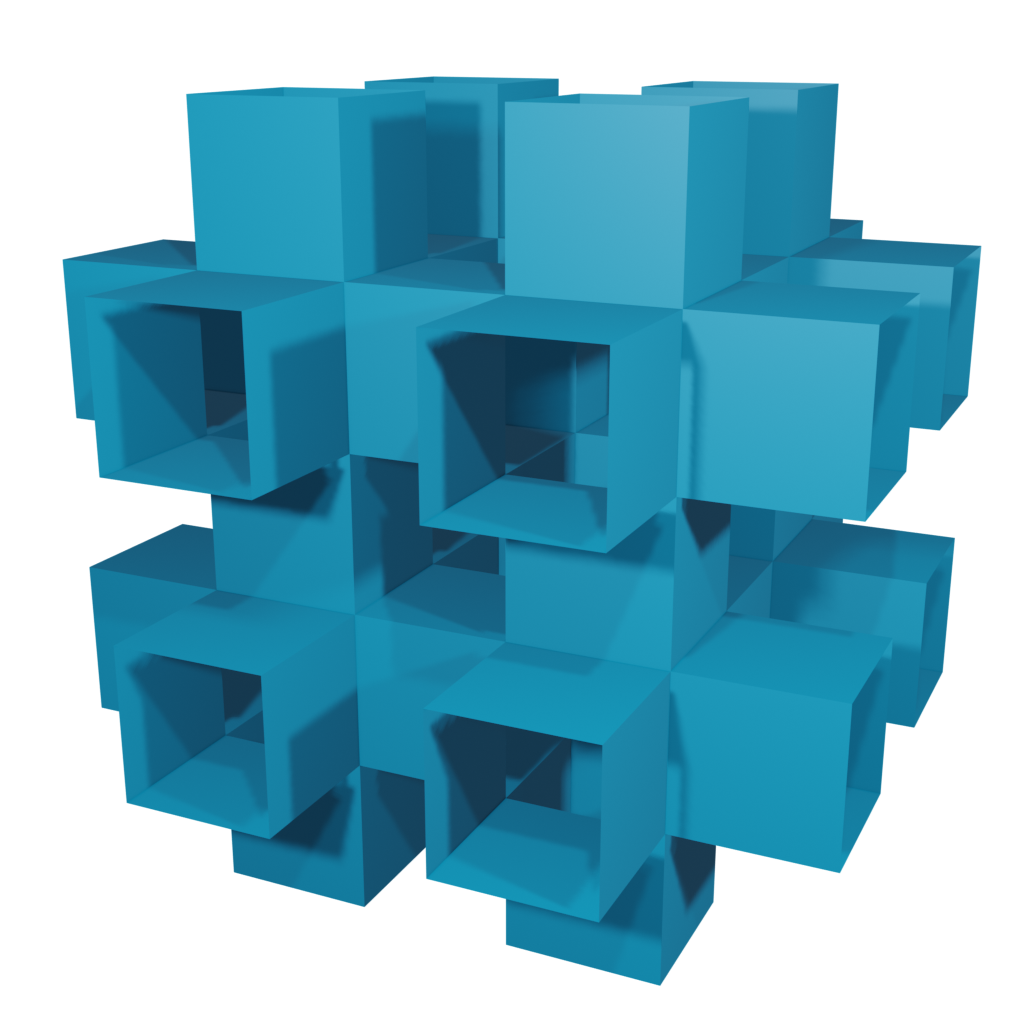
The mucube

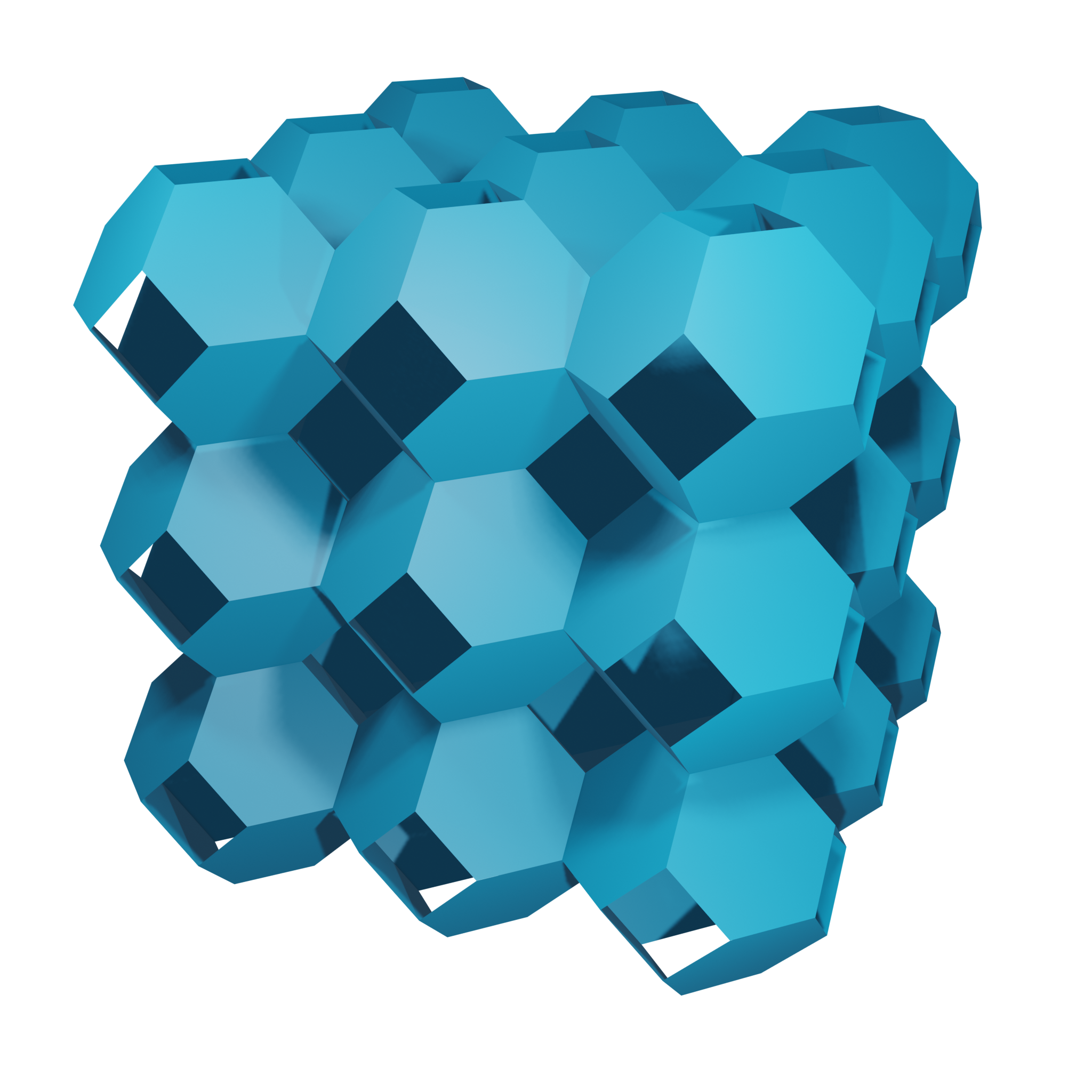
The muoctahedron

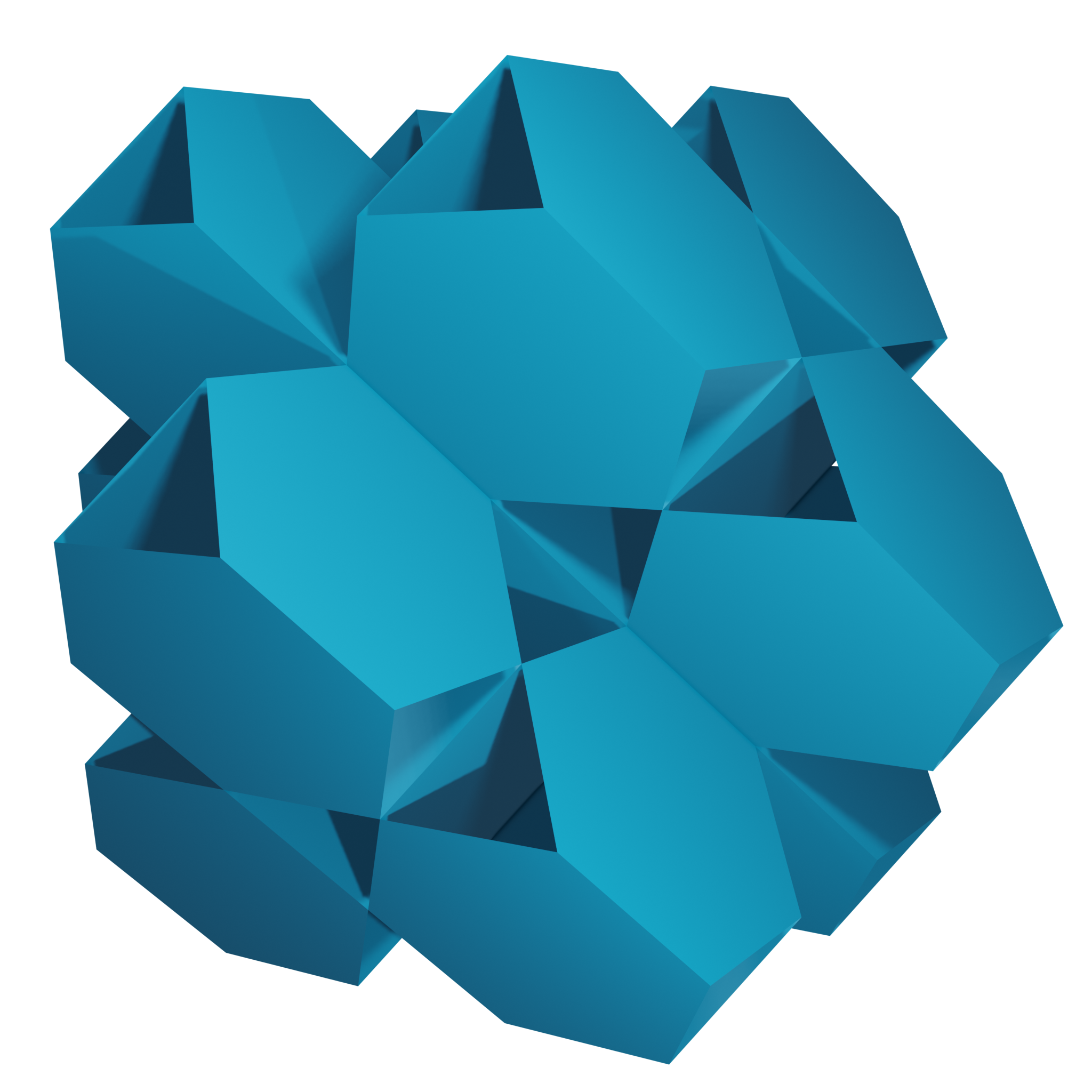
The mutetrahedron

Allowing for skew faces, there are 30 regular apeirohedra in Euclidean 3-space. These include the 12 blended apeirohedra created by blends with the Euclidean planar apeirohedra, and 18 pure apeirohedra, which cannot be expressed as a non-trivial blend including the planar apeirohedra and the three 3-dimensional apeirohedra above.

The 3-dimensional pure apeirohedra are:

- {4,6|4}, the mucube
- {∞,6}_{4,4}, the Petrial of the mucube
- {6,6|3}, the mutetrahedron
- {∞,6}_{6,3}, the Petrial of the mutetrahedron
- {6,4|4}, the muoctahedron
- {∞,4}_{6,4}, the Petrial of the muoctahedron
- {6,6}_{4}, the halving of the mucube
- {4,6}_{6}, the Petrial of {6,6}_{4}
- {∞,4}_{·,*3}, the skewing of the muoctahedron
- {6,4}_{6}, the skewing of {∞,4}_{6,4}
- {∞,3}^{(a)}
- {∞,3}^{(b)}

==== Skew apeirohedra in hyperbolic 3-space ====
There are 31 regular skew apeirohedra with convex faces in hyperbolic 3-space with compact or paracompact symmetry:

- 14 are compact: {8,10|3}, {10,8|3}, {10,4|3}, {4,10|3}, {6,4|5}, {4,6|5}, {10,6|3}, {6,10|3}, {8,8|3}, {6,6|4}, {10,10|3},{6,6|5}, {8,6|3}, and {6,8|3}.
- 17 are paracompact: {12,10|3}, {10,12|3}, {12,4|3}, {4,12|3}, {6,4|6}, {4,6|6}, {8,4|4}, {4,8|4}, {12,6|3}, {6,12|3}, {12,12|3}, {6,6|6}, {8,6|4}, {6,8|4}, {12,8|3}, {8,12|3}, and {8,8|4}.

=== 4-apeirotopes ===
==== Tessellations of Euclidean 3-space ====
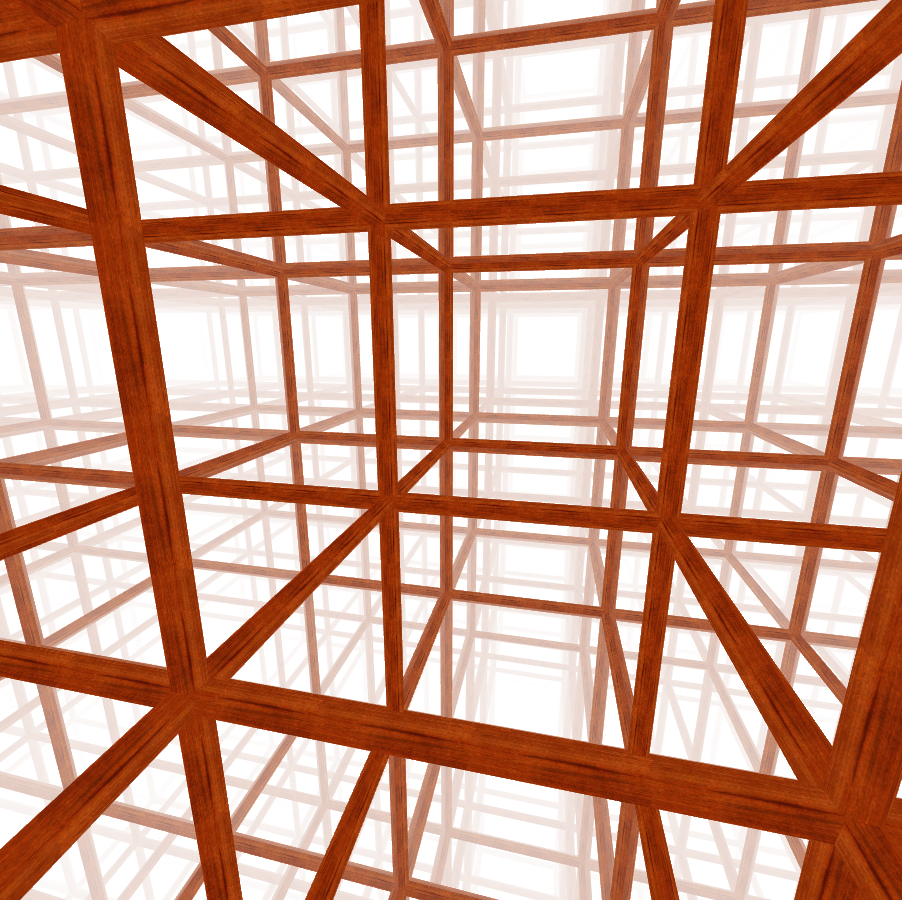
Edge framework of cubic honeycomb, {4,3,4}

There is only one non-degenerate regular tessellation of 3-space (honeycombs), {4, 3, 4}:

Name	Schläfli {p,q,r}	Coxeter	Cell type {p,q}	Face type {p}	Edge figure {r}	Vertex figure {q,r}	χ	Dual
Cubic honeycomb	{4,3,4}		{4,3}	{4}	{4}	{3,4}	0	Self-dual

==== Improper tessellations of Euclidean 3-space ====
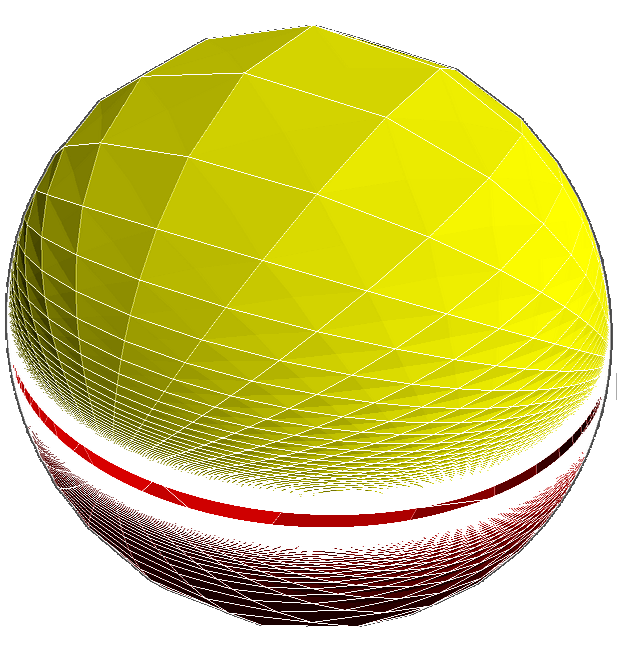
Regular {2,4,4} honeycomb, seen projected into a sphere.

There are six improper regular tessellations, pairs based on the three regular Euclidean tilings. Their cells and vertex figures are all regular hosohedra {2,n}, dihedra, {n,2}, and Euclidean tilings. These improper regular tilings are constructionally related to prismatic uniform honeycombs by truncation operations. They are higher-dimensional analogues of the order-2 apeirogonal tiling and apeirogonal hosohedron.

Schläfli {p,q,r}	Coxeter diagram	Cell type {p,q}	Face type {p}	Edge figure {r}	Vertex figure {q,r}
{2,4,4}		{2,4}	{2}	{4}	{4,4}
{2,3,6}		{2,3}	{2}	{6}	{3,6}
{2,6,3}		{2,6}	{2}	{3}	{6,3}
{4,4,2}		{4,4}	{4}	{2}	{4,2}
{3,6,2}		{3,6}	{3}	{2}	{6,2}
{6,3,2}		{6,3}	{6}	{2}	{3,2}

==== Tessellations of hyperbolic 3-space ====
There are 15 flat regular honeycombs of hyperbolic 3-space:

- 4 are compact: {3,5,3}, {4,3,5}, {5,3,4}, and {5,3,5}
- while 11 are paracompact: {3,3,6}, {6,3,3}, {3,4,4}, {4,4,3}, {3,6,3}, {4,3,6}, {6,3,4}, {4,4,4}, {5,3,6}, {6,3,5}, and {6,3,6}.

4 compact regular honeycombs
{5,3,4}	{5,3,5}
{4,3,5}	{3,5,3}

4 of 11 paracompact regular honeycombs
{3,4,4}	{3,6,3}
{4,4,3}	{4,4,4}

Tessellations of hyperbolic 3-space can be called hyperbolic honeycombs. There are 15 hyperbolic honeycombs in H^{3}, 4 compact and 11 paracompact.

4 compact regular honeycombs
Name	Schläfli Symbol {p,q,r}	Coxeter	Cell type {p,q}	Face type {p}	Edge figure {r}	Vertex figure {q,r}	χ	Dual
Icosahedral honeycomb	{3,5,3}		{3,5}	{3}	{3}	{5,3}	0	Self-dual
Order-5 cubic honeycomb	{4,3,5}		{4,3}	{4}	{5}	{3,5}	0	{5,3,4}
Order-4 dodecahedral honeycomb	{5,3,4}		{5,3}	{5}	{4}	{3,4}	0	{4,3,5}
Order-5 dodecahedral honeycomb	{5,3,5}		{5,3}	{5}	{5}	{3,5}	0	Self-dual

There are also 11 paracompact H^{3} honeycombs (those with infinite (Euclidean) cells and/or vertex figures): {3,3,6}, {6,3,3}, {3,4,4}, {4,4,3}, {3,6,3}, {4,3,6}, {6,3,4}, {4,4,4}, {5,3,6}, {6,3,5}, and {6,3,6}.

11 paracompact regular honeycombs
Name	Schläfli Symbol {p,q,r}	Coxeter	Cell type {p,q}	Face type {p}	Edge figure {r}	Vertex figure {q,r}	χ	Dual
Order-6 tetrahedral honeycomb	{3,3,6}		{3,3}	{3}	{6}	{3,6}	0	{6,3,3}
Hexagonal tiling honeycomb	{6,3,3}		{6,3}	{6}	{3}	{3,3}	0	{3,3,6}
Order-4 octahedral honeycomb	{3,4,4}		{3,4}	{3}	{4}	{4,4}	0	{4,4,3}
Square tiling honeycomb	{4,4,3}		{4,4}	{4}	{3}	{4,3}	0	{3,4,4}
Triangular tiling honeycomb	{3,6,3}		{3,6}	{3}	{3}	{6,3}	0	Self-dual
Order-6 cubic honeycomb	{4,3,6}		{4,3}	{4}	{4}	{3,6}	0	{6,3,4}
Order-4 hexagonal tiling honeycomb	{6,3,4}		{6,3}	{6}	{4}	{3,4}	0	{4,3,6}
Order-4 square tiling honeycomb	{4,4,4}		{4,4}	{4}	{4}	{4,4}	0	Self-dual
Order-6 dodecahedral honeycomb	{5,3,6}		{5,3}	{5}	{5}	{3,6}	0	{6,3,5}
Order-5 hexagonal tiling honeycomb	{6,3,5}		{6,3}	{6}	{5}	{3,5}	0	{5,3,6}
Order-6 hexagonal tiling honeycomb	{6,3,6}		{6,3}	{6}	{6}	{3,6}	0	Self-dual

Noncompact solutions exist as Lorentzian Coxeter groups, and can be visualized with open domains in hyperbolic space (the fundamental tetrahedron having ultra-ideal vertices). All honeycombs with hyperbolic cells or vertex figures and do not have 2 in their Schläfli symbol are noncompact.

Spherical (improper/Platonic)/Euclidean/hyperbolic(compact/paracompact/noncompact) honeycombs {p,3,r}
	{3,r}	{3,2}	{3,3}	{3,4}	{3,4}	{3,6}	{3,7}	{3,8}	... {3,∞}
{p,3}	p \ r	2	3	4	5	6	7	8	... ∞
{2,3}	2	{2,3,2}	{2,3,3}	{2,3,4}	{2,3,5}	{2,3,6}	{2,3,7}	{2,3,8}	{2,3,∞}
{3,3}	3	{3,3,2}	{3,3,3}	{3,3,4}	{3,3,5}	{3,3,6}	{3,3,7}	{3,3,8}	{3,3,∞}
{4,3}	4	{4,3,2}	{4,3,3}	{4,3,4}	{4,3,5}	{4,3,6}	{4,3,7}	{4,3,8}	{4,3,∞}
{5,3}	5	{5,3,2}	{5,3,3}	{5,3,4}	{5,3,5}	{5,3,6}	{5,3,7}	{5,3,8}	{5,3,∞}
{6,3}	6	{6,3,2}	{6,3,3}	{6,3,4}	{6,3,5}	{6,3,6}	{6,3,7}	{6,3,8}	{6,3,∞}
{7,3}	7	{7,3,2}	{7,3,3}	{7,3,4}	{7,3,5}	{7,3,6}	{7,3,7}	{7,3,8}	{7,3,∞}
{8,3}	8	{8,3,2}	{8,3,3}	{8,3,4}	{8,3,5}	{8,3,6}	{8,3,7}	{8,3,8}	{8,3,∞}
... {∞,3}	... ∞	{∞,3,2}	{∞,3,3}	{∞,3,4}	{∞,3,5}	{∞,3,6}	{∞,3,7}	{∞,3,8}	{∞,3,∞}

{p,4,r}
	{4,r}	{4,2}	{4,3}	{4,4}	{4,5}	{4,6}	{4,∞}
{p,4}	p \ r	2	3	4	5	6	∞
{2,4}	2	{2,4,2}	{2,4,3}	{2,4,4}	{2,4,5}	{2,4,6}	{2,4,∞}
{3,4}	3	{3,4,2}	{3,4,3}	{3,4,4}	{3,4,5}	{3,4,6}	{3,4,∞}
{4,4}	4	{4,4,2}	{4,4,3}	{4,4,4}	{4,4,5}	{4,4,6}	{4,4,∞}
{5,4}	5	{5,4,2}	{5,4,3}	{5,4,4}	{5,4,5}	{5,4,6}	{5,4,∞}
{6,4}	6	{6,4,2}	{6,4,3}	{6,4,4}	{6,4,5}	{6,4,6}	{6,4,∞}
{∞,4}	∞	{∞,4,2}	{∞,4,3}	{∞,4,4}	{∞,4,5}	{∞,4,6}	{∞,4,∞}

{p,5,r}
	{5,r}	{5,2}	{5,3}	{5,4}	{5,5}	{5,6}	{5,∞}
{p,5}	p \ r	2	3	4	5	6	∞
{2,5}	2	{2,5,2}	{2,5,3}	{2,5,4}	{2,5,5}	{2,5,6}	{2,5,∞}
{3,5}	3	{3,5,2}	{3,5,3}	{3,5,4}	{3,5,5}	{3,5,6}	{3,5,∞}
{4,5}	4	{4,5,2}	{4,5,3}	{4,5,4}	{4,5,5}	{4,5,6}	{4,5,∞}
{5,5}	5	{5,5,2}	{5,5,3}	{5,5,4}	{5,5,5}	{5,5,6}	{5,5,∞}
{6,5}	6	{6,5,2}	{6,5,3}	{6,5,4}	{6,5,5}	{6,5,6}	{6,5,∞}
{∞,5}	∞	{∞,5,2}	{∞,5,3}	{∞,5,4}	{∞,5,5}	{∞,5,6}	{∞,5,∞}

{p,6,r}
	{6,r}	{6,2}	{6,3}	{6,4}	{6,5}	{6,6}	{6,∞}
{p,6}	p \ r	2	3	4	5	6	∞
{2,6}	2	{2,6,2}	{2,6,3}	{2,6,4}	{2,6,5}	{2,6,6}	{2,6,∞}
{3,6}	3	{3,6,2}	{3,6,3}	{3,6,4}	{3,6,5}	{3,6,6}	{3,6,∞}
{4,6}	4	{4,6,2}	{4,6,3}	{4,6,4}	{4,6,5}	{4,6,6}	{4,6,∞}
{5,6}	5	{5,6,2}	{5,6,3}	{5,6,4}	{5,6,5}	{5,6,6}	{5,6,∞}
{6,6}	6	{6,6,2}	{6,6,3}	{6,6,4}	{6,6,5}	{6,6,6}	{6,6,∞}
{∞,6}	∞	{∞,6,2}	{∞,6,3}	{∞,6,4}	{∞,6,5}	{∞,6,6}	{∞,6,∞}

{p,7,r}
	{7,r}	{7,2}	{7,3}	{7,4}	{7,5}	{7,6}	{7,∞}
{p,7}	p \ r	2	3	4	5	6	∞
{2,7}	2	{2,7,2}	{2,7,3}	{2,7,4}	{2,7,5}	{2,7,6}	{2,7,∞}
{3,7}	3	{3,7,2}	{3,7,3}	{3,7,4}	{3,7,5}	{3,7,6}	{3,7,∞}
{4,7}	4	{4,7,2}	{4,7,3}	{4,7,4}	{4,7,5}	{4,7,6}	{4,7,∞}
{5,7}	5	{5,7,2}	{5,7,3}	{5,7,4}	{5,7,5}	{5,7,6}	{5,7,∞}
{6,7}	6	{6,7,2}	{6,7,3}	{6,7,4}	{6,7,5}	{6,7,6}	{6,7,∞}
{∞,7}	∞	{∞,7,2}	{∞,7,3}	{∞,7,4}	{∞,7,5}	{∞,7,6}	{∞,7,∞}

{p,8,r}
	{8,r}	{8,2}	{8,3}	{8,4}	{8,5}	{8,6}	{8,∞}
{p,8}	p \ r	2	3	4	5	6	∞
{2,8}	2	{2,8,2}	{2,8,3}	{2,8,4}	{2,8,5}	{2,8,6}	{2,8,∞}
{3,8}	3	{3,8,2}	{3,8,3}	{3,8,4}	{3,8,5}	{3,8,6}	{3,8,∞}
{4,8}	4	{4,8,2}	{4,8,3}	{4,8,4}	{4,8,5}	{4,8,6}	{4,8,∞}
{5,8}	5	{5,8,2}	{5,8,3}	{5,8,4}	{5,8,5}	{5,8,6}	{5,8,∞}
{6,8}	6	{6,8,2}	{6,8,3}	{6,8,4}	{6,8,5}	{6,8,6}	{6,8,∞}
{∞,8}	∞	{∞,8,2}	{∞,8,3}	{∞,8,4}	{∞,8,5}	{∞,8,6}	{∞,8,∞}

{p,∞,r}
	{∞,r}	{∞,2}	{∞,3}	{∞,4}	{∞,5}	{∞,6}	{∞,∞}
{p,∞}	p \ r	2	3	4	5	6	∞
{2,∞}	2	{2,∞,2}	{2,∞,3}	{2,∞,4}	{2,∞,5}	{2,∞,6}	{2,∞,∞}
{3,∞}	3	{3,∞,2}	{3,∞,3}	{3,∞,4}	{3,∞,5}	{3,∞,6}	{3,∞,∞}
{4,∞}	4	{4,∞,2}	{4,∞,3}	{4,∞,4}	{4,∞,5}	{4,∞,6}	{4,∞,∞}
{5,∞}	5	{5,∞,2}	{5,∞,3}	{5,∞,4}	{5,∞,5}	{5,∞,6}	{5,∞,∞}
{6,∞}	6	{6,∞,2}	{6,∞,3}	{6,∞,4}	{6,∞,5}	{6,∞,6}	{6,∞,∞}
{∞,∞}	∞	{∞,∞,2}	{∞,∞,3}	{∞,∞,4}	{∞,∞,5}	{∞,∞,6}	{∞,∞,∞}

There are no regular compact or paracompact hyperbolic star-honeycombs in H^{3}: all forms with a regular star polyhedron as cell, vertex figure or both end up being spherical.

Ideal vertices now appear when the vertex figure is a Euclidean tiling, becoming inscribable in a horosphere rather than a sphere. They are dual to ideal cells (Euclidean tilings rather than finite polyhedra). As the last number in the Schläfli symbol rises further, the vertex figure becomes hyperbolic, and vertices become ultra-ideal (so the edges do not meet within hyperbolic space). In honeycombs {p, q, ∞} the edges intersect the Poincaré ball only in one ideal point; the rest of the edge has become ultra-ideal. Continuing further would lead to edges that are completely ultra-ideal, both for the honeycomb and for the fundamental simplex (though still infinitely many {p, q} would meet at such edges). In general, when the last number of the Schläfli symbol becomes ∞, faces of codimension two intersect the Poincaré hyperball only in one ideal point.

=== 5-apeirotopes ===
==== Tessellations of Euclidean 4-space ====
There are three kinds of infinite regular tessellations (honeycombs) that can tessellate Euclidean four-dimensional space:

3 regular Euclidean honeycombs
Name	Schläfli Symbol {p,q,r,s}	Facet type {p,q,r}	Cell type {p,q}	Face type {p}	Face figure {s}	Edge figure {r,s}	Vertex figure {q,r,s}	Dual
Tesseractic honeycomb	{4,3,3,4}	{4,3,3}	{4,3}	{4}	{4}	{3,4}	{3,3,4}	Self-dual
16-cell honeycomb	{3,3,4,3}	{3,3,4}	{3,3}	{3}	{3}	{4,3}	{3,4,3}	{3,4,3,3}
24-cell honeycomb	{3,4,3,3}	{3,4,3}	{3,4}	{3}	{3}	{3,3}	{4,3,3}	{3,3,4,3}

Projected portion of {4,3,3,4} (Tesseractic honeycomb)	Projected portion of {3,3,4,3} (16-cell honeycomb)	Projected portion of {3,4,3,3} (24-cell honeycomb)

There are also the two improper cases {4,3,4,2} and {2,4,3,4}.

There are three flat regular honeycombs of Euclidean 4-space:

- {4,3,3,4}, {3,3,4,3}, and {3,4,3,3}.

There are seven flat regular convex honeycombs of hyperbolic 4-space:

- 5 are compact: {3,3,3,5}, {5,3,3,3}, {4,3,3,5}, {5,3,3,4}, {5,3,3,5}
- 2 are paracompact: {3,4,3,4}, and {4,3,4,3}.

There are four flat regular star honeycombs of hyperbolic 4-space:

- {5/2,5,3,3}, {3,3,5,5/2}, {3,5,5/2,5}, and {5,5/2,5,3}.

==== Tessellations of hyperbolic 4-space ====
There are seven convex regular honeycombs and four star-honeycombs in H^{4} space. Five convex ones are compact, and two are paracompact.

Five compact regular honeycombs in H^{4}:

5 compact regular honeycombs
Name	Schläfli Symbol {p,q,r,s}	Facet type {p,q,r}	Cell type {p,q}	Face type {p}	Face figure {s}	Edge figure {r,s}	Vertex figure {q,r,s}	Dual
Order-5 5-cell honeycomb	{3,3,3,5}	{3,3,3}	{3,3}	{3}	{5}	{3,5}	{3,3,5}	{5,3,3,3}
120-cell honeycomb	{5,3,3,3}	{5,3,3}	{5,3}	{5}	{3}	{3,3}	{3,3,3}	{3,3,3,5}
Order-5 tesseractic honeycomb	{4,3,3,5}	{4,3,3}	{4,3}	{4}	{5}	{3,5}	{3,3,5}	{5,3,3,4}
Order-4 120-cell honeycomb	{5,3,3,4}	{5,3,3}	{5,3}	{5}	{4}	{3,4}	{3,3,4}	{4,3,3,5}
Order-5 120-cell honeycomb	{5,3,3,5}	{5,3,3}	{5,3}	{5}	{5}	{3,5}	{3,3,5}	Self-dual

The two paracompact regular H^{4} honeycombs are: {3,4,3,4}, {4,3,4,3}.

2 paracompact regular honeycombs
Name	Schläfli Symbol {p,q,r,s}	Facet type {p,q,r}	Cell type {p,q}	Face type {p}	Face figure {s}	Edge figure {r,s}	Vertex figure {q,r,s}	Dual
Order-4 24-cell honeycomb	{3,4,3,4}	{3,4,3}	{3,4}	{3}	{4}	{3,4}	{4,3,4}	{4,3,4,3}
Cubic honeycomb honeycomb	{4,3,4,3}	{4,3,4}	{4,3}	{4}	{3}	{4,3}	{3,4,3}	{3,4,3,4}

Noncompact solutions exist as Lorentzian Coxeter groups, and can be visualized with open domains in hyperbolic space (the fundamental 5-cell having some parts inaccessible beyond infinity). All honeycombs which are not shown in the set of tables below and do not have 2 in their Schläfli symbol are noncompact.

Spherical/Euclidean/hyperbolic(compact/paracompact/noncompact) honeycombs {p,q,r,s}

q=3, s=3
p \ r	3	4	5
3	{3,3,3,3}	{3,3,4,3}	{3,3,5,3}
4	{4,3,3,3}	{4,3,4,3}	{4,3,5,3}
5	{5,3,3,3}	{5,3,4,3}	{5,3,5,3}

q=3, s=4
p \ r	3	4
3	{3,3,3,4}	{3,3,4,4}
4	{4,3,3,4}	{4,3,4,4}
5	{5,3,3,4}	{5,3,4,4}

q=3, s=5
p \ r	3	4
3	{3,3,3,5}	{3,3,4,5}
4	{4,3,3,5}	{4,3,4,5}
5	{5,3,3,5}	{5,3,4,5}

q=4, s=3
p \ r	3	4
3	{3,4,3,3}	{3,4,4,3}
4	{4,4,3,3}	{4,4,4,3}

q=4, s=4
p \ r	3	4
3	{3,4,3,4}	{3,4,4,4}
4	{4,4,3,4}	{4,4,4,4}

q=4, s=5
p \ r	3	4
3	{3,4,3,5}	{3,4,4,5}
4	{4,4,3,5}	{4,4,4,5}

q=5, s=3
p \ r	3	4
3	{3,5,3,3}	{3,5,4,3}
4	{4,5,3,3}	{4,5,4,3}

==== Star tessellations of hyperbolic 4-space ====
There are four regular star-honeycombs in H^{4} space, all compact:

4 compact regular star-honeycombs
Name	Schläfli Symbol {p,q,r,s}	Facet type {p,q,r}	Cell type {p,q}	Face type {p}	Face figure {s}	Edge figure {r,s}	Vertex figure {q,r,s}	Dual	Density
Small stellated 120-cell honeycomb	{5/2,5,3,3}	{5/2,5,3}	{5/2,5}	{5/2}	{3}	{3,3}	{5,3,3}	{3,3,5,5/2}	5
Pentagrammic-order 600-cell honeycomb	{3,3,5,5/2}	{3,3,5}	{3,3}	{3}	{5/2}	{5,5/2}	{3,5,5/2}	{5/2,5,3,3}	5
Order-5 icosahedral 120-cell honeycomb	{3,5,5/2,5}	{3,5,5/2}	{3,5}	{3}	{5}	{5/2,5}	{5,5/2,5}	{5,5/2,5,3}	10
Great 120-cell honeycomb	{5,5/2,5,3}	{5,5/2,5}	{5,5/2}	{5}	{3}	{5,3}	{5/2,5,3}	{3,5,5/2,5}	10

=== 6-apeirotopes ===
There is only one flat regular honeycomb of Euclidean 5-space: (previously listed above as tessellations)

- {4,3,3,3,4}

There are five flat regular regular honeycombs of hyperbolic 5-space, all paracompact: (previously listed above as tessellations)

- {3,3,3,4,3}, {3,4,3,3,3}, {3,3,4,3,3}, {3,4,3,3,4}, and {4,3,3,4,3}

==== Tessellations of Euclidean 5-space ====
The hypercubic honeycomb is the only family of regular honeycombs that can tessellate each dimension, five or higher, formed by hypercube facets, four around every ridge.

Name	Schläfli {p_{1}, p_{2}, ..., p_{n−1}}	Facet type	Vertex figure	Dual
Square tiling	{4,4}	{4}	{4}	Self-dual
Cubic honeycomb	{4,3,4}	{4,3}	{3,4}	Self-dual
Tesseractic honeycomb	{4,3^{2},4}	{4,3^{2}}	{3^{2},4}	Self-dual
5-cube honeycomb	{4,3^{3},4}	{4,3^{3}}	{3^{3},4}	Self-dual
6-cube honeycomb	{4,3^{4},4}	{4,3^{4}}	{3^{4},4}	Self-dual
7-cube honeycomb	{4,3^{5},4}	{4,3^{5}}	{3^{5},4}	Self-dual
8-cube honeycomb	{4,3^{6},4}	{4,3^{6}}	{3^{6},4}	Self-dual
n-hypercubic honeycomb	{4,3^{n−2},4}	{4,3^{n−2}}	{3^{n−2},4}	Self-dual

In E^{5}, there are also the improper cases {4,3,3,4,2}, {2,4,3,3,4}, {3,3,4,3,2}, {2,3,3,4,3}, {3,4,3,3,2}, and {2,3,4,3,3}. In E^{n}, {4,3^{n−3},4,2} and {2,4,3^{n−3},4} are always improper Euclidean tessellations.

==== Tessellations of hyperbolic 5-space ====
There are 5 regular honeycombs in H^{5}, all paracompact, which include infinite (Euclidean) facets or vertex figures: {3,4,3,3,3}, {3,3,4,3,3}, {3,3,3,4,3}, {3,4,3,3,4}, and {4,3,3,4,3}.

There are no compact regular tessellations of hyperbolic space of dimension 5 or higher and no paracompact regular tessellations in hyperbolic space of dimension 6 or higher.

5 paracompact regular honeycombs
Name	Schläfli Symbol {p,q,r,s,t}	Facet type {p,q,r,s}	4-face type {p,q,r}	Cell type {p,q}	Face type {p}	Cell figure {t}	Face figure {s,t}	Edge figure {r,s,t}	Vertex figure {q,r,s,t}	Dual
5-orthoplex honeycomb	{3,3,3,4,3}	{3,3,3,4}	{3,3,3}	{3,3}	{3}	{3}	{4,3}	{3,4,3}	{3,3,4,3}	{3,4,3,3,3}
24-cell honeycomb honeycomb	{3,4,3,3,3}	{3,4,3,3}	{3,4,3}	{3,4}	{3}	{3}	{3,3}	{3,3,3}	{4,3,3,3}	{3,3,3,4,3}
16-cell honeycomb honeycomb	{3,3,4,3,3}	{3,3,4,3}	{3,3,4}	{3,3}	{3}	{3}	{3,3}	{4,3,3}	{3,4,3,3}	self-dual
Order-4 24-cell honeycomb honeycomb	{3,4,3,3,4}	{3,4,3,3}	{3,4,3}	{3,4}	{3}	{4}	{3,4}	{3,3,4}	{4,3,3,4}	{4,3,3,4,3}
Tesseractic honeycomb honeycomb	{4,3,3,4,3}	{4,3,3,4}	{4,3,3}	{4,3}	{4}	{3}	{4,3}	{3,4,3}	{3,3,4,3}	{3,4,3,3,4}

Since there are no regular star n-polytopes for n ≥ 5, that could be potential cells or vertex figures, there are no more hyperbolic star honeycombs in H^{n} for n ≥ 5.

=== Apeirotopes of rank 7 or more ===
==== Tessellations of hyperbolic 6-space and higher ====
There are no regular compact or paracompact tessellations of hyperbolic space of dimension 6 or higher.

== Abstract polytopes ==
The abstract polytopes arose out of an attempt to study polytopes apart from the geometrical space they are embedded in. They include the tessellations of spherical, Euclidean and hyperbolic space, and of other manifolds. There are infinitely many of every rank greater than 1. See this atlas for a sample. Some notable examples of abstract regular polytopes that do not appear elsewhere in this list are the 11-cell, {3,5,3}, and the 57-cell, {5,3,5}, which have regular projective polyhedra as cells and vertex figures.

The elements of an abstract polyhedron are its body (the maximal element), its faces, edges, vertices and the null polytope or empty set. These abstract elements can be mapped into ordinary space or realised as geometrical figures. Some abstract polyhedra have well-formed or faithful realisations, others do not. A flag is a connected set of elements of each rank - for a polyhedron that is the body, a face, an edge of the face, a vertex of the edge, and the null polytope. An abstract polytope is said to be regular if its combinatorial symmetries are transitive on its flags - that is to say, that any flag can be mapped onto any other under a symmetry of the polyhedron. Abstract regular polytopes remain an active area of research.

Five such regular abstract polyhedra, which cannot be realised faithfully and symmetrically, were identified by H. S. M. Coxeter in his book Regular Polytopes (1977) and again by J. M. Wills in his paper "The combinatorially regular polyhedra of index 2" (1987). They are all topologically equivalent to toroids. Their construction, by arranging n faces around each vertex, can be repeated indefinitely as tilings of the hyperbolic plane. In the diagrams below, the hyperbolic tiling images have colors corresponding to those of the polyhedra images.

Polyhedron	Medial rhombic triacontahedron	Dodecadodecahedron	Medial triambic icosahedron	Ditrigonal dodecadodecahedron	Excavated dodecahedron
Vertex figure	{5}, {5/2}	(5.5/2)^{2}	{5}, {5/2}	(5.5/3)^{3}	
Faces	30 rhombi	12 pentagons 12 pentagrams	20 hexagons	12 pentagons 12 pentagrams	20 hexagrams
Tiling	{4, 5}	{5, 4}	{6, 5}	{5, 6}	{6, 6}
χ	−6	−6	−16	−16	−20

These occur as dual pairs as follows:

- The medial rhombic triacontahedron and dodecadodecahedron are dual to each other.
- The medial triambic icosahedron and ditrigonal dodecadodecahedron are dual to each other.
- The excavated dodecahedron is self-dual.

== See also ==
- List of regular polytope compounds
- Polygon
- Polyhedron
- Platonic solids
- Kepler–Poinsot solids
- 4-polytope
- Regular 4-polytope (16 regular 4-polytopes, 4 convex and 10 star (Schläfli–Hess))
- Tessellation
- Tilings of regular polygons
- Convex uniform honeycomb
- Regular map (graph theory)

== Notes ==
Fundamental convex regular and uniform polytopes in dimensions 2–10
Family	A_{n}	B_{n}	I_{2}(p) / D_{n}	E_{6} / E_{7} / E_{8} / F_{4} / G_{2}	H_{n}
Regular polygon	Triangle	Square	p-gon	Hexagon	Pentagon
Uniform polyhedron	Tetrahedron	Octahedron • Cube	Demicube		Dodecahedron • Icosahedron
Uniform polychoron	Pentachoron	16-cell • Tesseract	Demitesseract	24-cell	120-cell • 600-cell
Uniform 5-polytope	5-simplex	5-orthoplex • 5-cube	5-demicube		
Uniform 6-polytope	6-simplex	6-orthoplex • 6-cube	6-demicube	1_{22} • 2_{21}	
Uniform 7-polytope	7-simplex	7-orthoplex • 7-cube	7-demicube	1_{32} • 2_{31} • 3_{21}	
Uniform 8-polytope	8-simplex	8-orthoplex • 8-cube	8-demicube	1_{42} • 2_{41} • 4_{21}	
Uniform 9-polytope	9-simplex	9-orthoplex • 9-cube	9-demicube		
Uniform 10-polytope	10-simplex	10-orthoplex • 10-cube	10-demicube		
Uniform n-polytope	n-simplex	n-orthoplex • n-cube	n-demicube	1_{k2} • 2_{k1} • k_{21}	n-pentagonal polytope
Topics: Polytope families • Regular polytope • List of regular polytopes and compounds • Polytope operations

Fundamental convex regular and uniform honeycombs in dimensions 2–9
Space	Family	${\tilde{A}}_{n-1}$	${\tilde{C}}_{n-1}$	${\tilde{B}}_{n-1}$	${\tilde{D}}_{n-1}$	${\tilde{G}}_2$ / ${\tilde{F}}_4$ / ${\tilde{E}}_{n-1}$
E^{2}	Uniform tiling	0_{[3]}	δ_{3}	hδ_{3}	qδ_{3}	Hexagonal
E^{3}	Uniform convex honeycomb	0_{[4]}	δ_{4}	hδ_{4}	qδ_{4}	
E^{4}	Uniform 4-honeycomb	0_{[5]}	δ_{5}	hδ_{5}	qδ_{5}	24-cell honeycomb
E^{5}	Uniform 5-honeycomb	0_{[6]}	δ_{6}	hδ_{6}	qδ_{6}	
E^{6}	Uniform 6-honeycomb	0_{[7]}	δ_{7}	hδ_{7}	qδ_{7}	2_{22}
E^{7}	Uniform 7-honeycomb	0_{[8]}	δ_{8}	hδ_{8}	qδ_{8}	1_{33} • 3_{31}
E^{8}	Uniform 8-honeycomb	0_{[9]}	δ_{9}	hδ_{9}	qδ_{9}	1_{52} • 2_{51} • 5_{21}
E^{9}	Uniform 9-honeycomb	0_{[10]}	δ_{10}	hδ_{10}	qδ_{10}	
E^{10}	Uniform 10-honeycomb	0_{[11]}	δ_{11}	hδ_{11}	qδ_{11}	
E^{n−1}	Uniform (n−1)-honeycomb	0_{[n]}	δ_{n}	hδ_{n}	qδ_{n}	1_{k2} • 2_{k1} • k_{21}
