= Infinite-order hexagonal tiling =

Infinite-order hexagonal tiling
Poincaré disk model of the hyperbolic plane
Type	Hyperbolic regular tiling
Vertex configuration	6^{∞}
Schläfli symbol	{6,∞}
Wythoff symbol	∞ | 6 2
Coxeter diagram	
Symmetry group	[∞,6], (*∞62)
Dual	Order-6 apeirogonal tiling
Properties	Vertex-transitive, edge-transitive, face-transitive

In 2-dimensional hyperbolic geometry, the infinite-order hexagonal tiling is a regular tiling. It has Schläfli symbol of {6,∞}. All vertices are ideal, located at "infinity", seen on the boundary of the Poincaré hyperbolic disk projection.

== Symmetry ==
There is a half symmetry form,, seen with alternating colors:

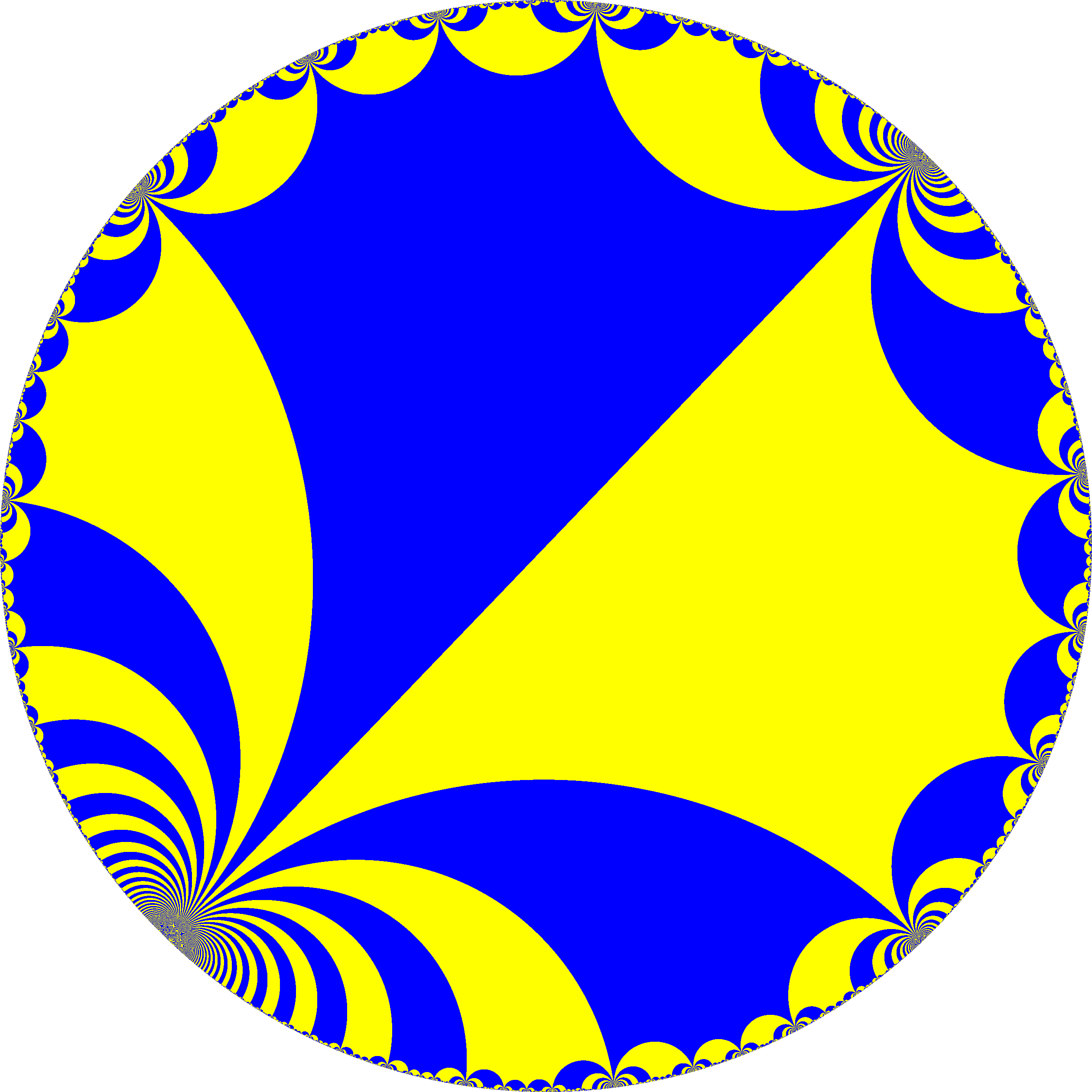

== Related polyhedra and tiling ==
This tiling is topologically related as a part of sequence of regular polyhedra and tilings with vertex figure (6^{n}).

*n62 symmetry mutation of regular tilings: {6,n}
Spherical	Euclidean	Hyperbolic tilings						
{6,2}	{6,3}	{6,4}	{6,5}	{6,6}	{6,7}	{6,8}	...	{6,∞}

== See also ==
- Hexagonal tiling
- Uniform tilings in hyperbolic plane
- List of regular polytopes
