= Order-6 apeirogonal tiling =

Tiling of the hyperbolic plane

Order-6 apeirogonal tiling
Poincaré disk model of the hyperbolic plane
Type	Hyperbolic regular tiling
Vertex configuration	∞^{6}
Schläfli symbol	{∞,6}
Wythoff symbol	6 | ∞ 2
Coxeter diagram	
Symmetry group	[∞,6], (*∞62)
Dual	Infinite-order hexagonal tiling
Properties	Vertex-transitive, edge-transitive, face-transitive edge-transitive

In geometry, the order-6 apeirogonal tiling is a regular tiling of the hyperbolic plane. It has Schläfli symbol of {∞,6}.

== Symmetry ==
The dual to this tiling represents the fundamental domains of [∞,6*] symmetry, orbifold notation *∞∞∞∞∞∞ symmetry, a hexagonal domain with five ideal vertices.

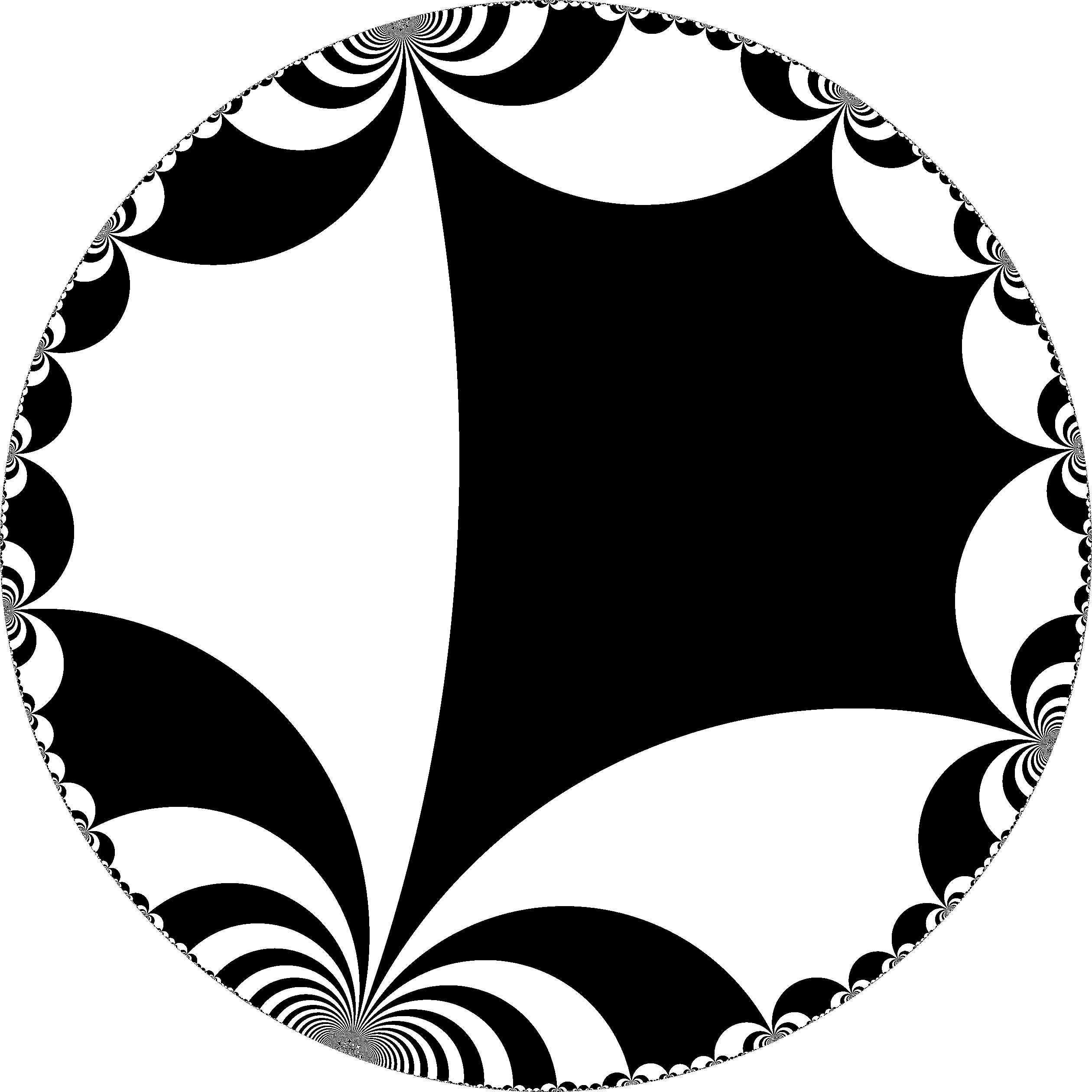

The order-6 apeirogonal tiling can be uniformly colored with 6 colored apeirogons around each vertex, and coxeter diagram:, except ultraparallel branches on the diagonals.

== Related polyhedra and tiling ==
This tiling is also topologically related as a part of sequence of regular polyhedra and tilings with six faces per vertex, starting with the triangular tiling, with Schläfli symbol {n,6}, and Coxeter diagram, with n progressing to infinity.

Regular tilings {n,6}
Spherical	Euclidean	Hyperbolic tilings						
{2,6}	{3,6}	{4,6}	{5,6}	{6,6}	{7,6}	{8,6}	...	{∞,6}

== See also ==
- Tilings of regular polygons
- List of uniform planar tilings
- List of regular polytopes
