= Order-7 dodecahedral honeycomb =

Order-7 dodecahedral honeycomb
Type	Regular honeycomb
Schläfli symbols	{5,3,7}
Coxeter diagrams	
Cells	{5,3}
Faces	{5}
Edge figure	{7}
Vertex figure	{3,7}
Dual	{7,3,5}
Coxeter group	[5,3,7]
Properties	Regular

In the geometry of hyperbolic 3-space, the order-7 dodecahedral honeycomb is a regular space-filling tessellation (or honeycomb).

== Geometry ==
With Schläfli symbol {5,3,7}, it has seven dodecahedra {5,3} around each edge. All vertices are ultra-ideal (existing beyond the ideal boundary) with infinitely many dodecahedra existing around each vertex in an order-7 triangular tiling vertex arrangement.

Poincaré disk model Cell-centered	Poincaré disk model	Ideal surface

== Related polytopes and honeycombs ==
It a part of a sequence of regular polytopes and honeycombs with dodecahedral cells, {5,3,p}.

{5,3,p} polytopes
Space	S^{3}	H^{3}					
Form	Finite	Compact		Paracompact	Noncompact		
Name	{5,3,3}	{5,3,4}	{5,3,5}	{5,3,6}	{5,3,7}	{5,3,8}	... {5,3,∞}
Image							
Vertex figure	{3,3}	{3,4}	{3,5}	{3,6}	{3,7}	{3,8}	{3,∞}

It a part of a sequence of honeycombs {5,p,7}.

It a part of a sequence of honeycombs {p,3,7}.

{3,3,7}	{4,3,7}	{5,3,7}	{6,3,7}	{7,3,7}	{8,3,7}	{∞,3,7}

=== Order-8 dodecahedral honeycomb ===
Order-8 dodecahedral honeycomb
Type	Regular honeycomb
Schläfli symbols	{5,3,8} {5,(3,4,3)}
Coxeter diagrams	=
Cells	{5,3}
Faces	{5}
Edge figure	{8}
Vertex figure	{3,8}, {(3,4,3)}
Dual	{8,3,5}
Coxeter group	[5,3,8] [5,((3,4,3))]
Properties	Regular

In the geometry of hyperbolic 3-space, the order-8 dodecahedral honeycomb a regular space-filling tessellation (or honeycomb). With Schläfli symbol {5,3,8}, it has eight dodecahedra {5,3} around each edge. All vertices are ultra-ideal (existing beyond the ideal boundary) with infinitely many dodecahedra existing around each vertex in an order-8 triangular tiling vertex arrangement.

Poincaré disk model Cell-centered	Poincaré disk model

It has a second construction as a uniform honeycomb, Schläfli symbol {5,(3,4,3)}, Coxeter diagram,, with alternating types or colors of dodecahedral cells.

=== Infinite-order dodecahedral honeycomb ===
Infinite-order dodecahedral honeycomb
Type	Regular honeycomb
Schläfli symbols	{5,3,∞} {5,(3,∞,3)}
Coxeter diagrams	=
Cells	{5,3}
Faces	{5}
Edge figure	{∞}
Vertex figure	{3,∞}, {(3,∞,3)}
Dual	{∞,3,5}
Coxeter group	[5,3,∞] [5,((3,∞,3))]
Properties	Regular

In the geometry of hyperbolic 3-space, the infinite-order dodecahedral honeycomb a regular space-filling tessellation (or honeycomb). With Schläfli symbol {5,3,∞}. It has infinitely many dodecahedra {5,3} around each edge. All vertices are ultra-ideal (existing beyond the ideal boundary) with infinitely many dodecahedra existing around each vertex in an infinite-order triangular tiling vertex arrangement.

Poincaré disk model Cell-centered	Poincaré disk model	Ideal surface

It has a second construction as a uniform honeycomb, Schläfli symbol {5,(3,∞,3)}, Coxeter diagram,, with alternating types or colors of dodecahedral cells.

== See also ==
- Convex uniform honeycombs in hyperbolic space
- List of regular polytopes
- Infinite-order hexagonal tiling honeycomb
