= Infinite-order triangular tiling =

Concept in geometry

Infinite-order triangular tiling
Poincaré disk model of the hyperbolic plane
Type	Hyperbolic regular tiling
Vertex configuration	3^{∞}
Schläfli symbol	{3,∞}
Wythoff symbol	∞ | 3 2
Coxeter diagram	
Symmetry group	[∞,3], (*∞32)
Dual	Order-3 apeirogonal tiling
Properties	Vertex-transitive, edge-transitive, face-transitive

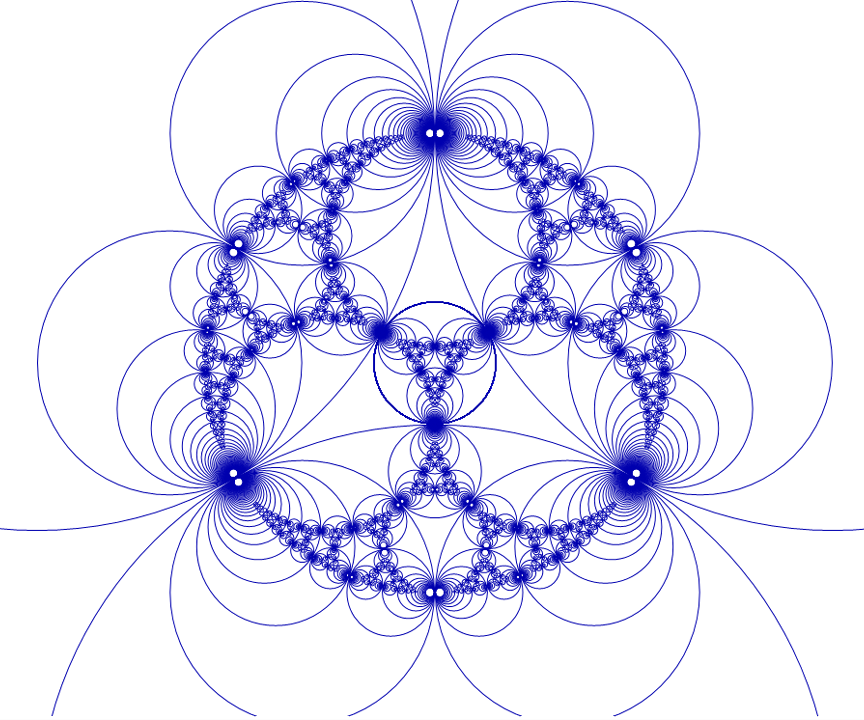
The {3,3,∞} honeycomb has {3,∞} vertex figures.

In geometry, the infinite-order triangular tiling is a regular tiling of the hyperbolic plane with a Schläfli symbol of {3,∞}. All vertices are ideal, located at "infinity" and seen on the boundary of the Poincaré hyperbolic disk projection.

== Symmetry ==
A lower symmetry form has alternating colors, and represented by cyclic symbol {(3,∞,3)},. The tiling also represents the fundamental domains of the *∞∞∞ symmetry, which can be seen with 3 colors of lines representing 3 mirrors of the construction.

Alternated colored tiling	*∞∞∞ symmetry	Apollonian gasket with *∞∞∞ symmetry

== Related polyhedra and tiling ==
This tiling is topologically related as part of a sequence of regular polyhedra with Schläfli symbol {3,p}.

*n32 symmetry mutation of regular tilings: {3,n}
Spherical				Euclid.	Compact hyper.		Paraco.	Noncompact hyperbolic			
3.3	3^{3}	3^{4}	3^{5}	3^{6}	3^{7}	3^{8}	3^{∞}	3^{12i}	3^{9i}	3^{6i}	3^{3i}

Paracompact uniform tilings in [∞,3] family
Symmetry: [∞,3], (*∞32)							[∞,3]^{+} (∞32)	[1^{+},∞,3] (*∞33)		[∞,3^{+}] (3*∞)
		=	=	=				= or	= or	=
{∞,3}	t{∞,3}	r{∞,3}	t{3,∞}	{3,∞}	rr{∞,3}	tr{∞,3}	sr{∞,3}	h{∞,3}	h_{2}{∞,3}	s{3,∞}
Uniform duals
V∞^{3}	V3.∞.∞	V(3.∞)^{2}	V6.6.∞	V3^{∞}	V4.3.4.∞	V4.6.∞	V3.3.3.3.∞	V(3.∞)^{3}		V3.3.3.3.3.∞

Paracompact hyperbolic uniform tilings in [(∞,3,3)] family
Symmetry: [(∞,3,3)], (*∞33)							[(∞,3,3)]^{+}, (∞33)
(∞,∞,3)	t_{0,1}(∞,3,3)	t_{1}(∞,3,3)	t_{1,2}(∞,3,3)	t_{2}(∞,3,3)	t_{0,2}(∞,3,3)	t_{0,1,2}(∞,3,3)	s(∞,3,3)
Dual tilings
V(3.∞)^{3}	V3.∞.3.∞	V(3.∞)^{3}	V3.6.∞.6	V(3.3)^{∞}	V3.6.∞.6	V6.6.∞	V3.3.3.3.3.∞

=== Other infinite-order triangular tilings ===
A nonregular infinite-order triangular tiling can be generated by a recursive process from a central triangle as shown here:

== See also ==
- Infinite-order tetrahedral honeycomb
- List of regular polytopes
- List of uniform planar tilings
- Tilings of regular polygons
- Triangular tiling
- Uniform tilings in hyperbolic plane
