= Order-4-3 pentagonal honeycomb =

Order-4-3 pentagonal honeycomb
Type	Regular honeycomb
Schläfli symbol	{5,4,3}
Coxeter diagram	
Cells	{5,4}
Faces	{5}
Vertex figure	{4,3}
Dual	{3,4,5}
Coxeter group	[5,4,3]
Properties	Regular

In the geometry of hyperbolic 3-space, the order-4-3 pentagonal honeycomb or 5,4,3 honeycomb is a regular space-filling tessellation (or honeycomb). Each infinite cell is an order-4 pentagonal tiling whose vertices lie on a 2-hypercycle, each of which has a limiting circle on the ideal sphere.

== Geometry ==
The Schläfli symbol of the order-4-3 pentagonal honeycomb is {5,4,3}, with three order-4 pentagonal tilings meeting at each edge. The vertex figure of this honeycomb is a cube, {4,3}.

Poincaré disk model (Vertex centered)	Ideal surface

== Related polytopes and honeycombs ==
It is a part of a series of regular polytopes and honeycombs with {p,4,3} Schläfli symbol, and tetrahedral vertex figures:

=== Order-4-3 hexagonal honeycomb ===
Order-4-3 hexagonal honeycomb
Type	Regular honeycomb
Schläfli symbol	{6,4,3}
Coxeter diagram	
Cells	{6,4}
Faces	{6}
Vertex figure	{4,3}
Dual	{3,4,6}
Coxeter group	[6,4,3]
Properties	Regular

In the geometry of hyperbolic 3-space, the order-4-3 hexagonal honeycomb or 6,4,3 honeycomb a regular space-filling tessellation (or honeycomb). Each infinite cell consists of an order-4 hexagonal tiling whose vertices lie on a 2-hypercycle, each of which has a limiting circle on the ideal sphere.

The Schläfli symbol of the order-4-3 hexagonal honeycomb is {6,4,3}, with three order-4 hexagonal tilings meeting at each edge. The vertex figure of this honeycomb is a cube, {4,3}.

Poincaré disk model (Vertex centered)	Ideal surface

=== Order-4-3 heptagonal honeycomb ===
Order-4-3 heptagonal honeycomb
Type	Regular honeycomb
Schläfli symbol	{7,4,3}
Coxeter diagram	
Cells	{7,4}
Faces	{7}
Vertex figure	{4,3}
Dual	{3,4,7}
Coxeter group	[7,4,3]
Properties	Regular

In the geometry of hyperbolic 3-space, the order-4-3 heptagonal honeycomb or 7,4,3 honeycomb a regular space-filling tessellation (or honeycomb). Each infinite cell consists of an order-4 heptagonal tiling whose vertices lie on a 2-hypercycle, each of which has a limiting circle on the ideal sphere.

The Schläfli symbol of the order-4-3 heptagonal honeycomb is {7,4,3}, with three order-4 heptagonal tilings meeting at each edge. The vertex figure of this honeycomb is a cube, {4,3}.

Poincaré disk model (Vertex centered)	Ideal surface

=== Order-4-3 octagonal honeycomb ===
Order-4-3 octagonal honeycomb
Type	Regular honeycomb
Schläfli symbol	{8,4,3}
Coxeter diagram	
Cells	{8,4}
Faces	{8}
Vertex figure	{4,3}
Dual	{3,4,8}
Coxeter group	[8,4,3]
Properties	Regular

In the geometry of hyperbolic 3-space, the order-4-3 octagonal honeycomb or 8,4,3 honeycomb a regular space-filling tessellation (or honeycomb). Each infinite cell consists of an order-4 octagonal tiling whose vertices lie on a 2-hypercycle, each of which has a limiting circle on the ideal sphere.

The Schläfli symbol of the order-4-3 octagonal honeycomb is {8,4,3}, with three order-4 octagonal tilings meeting at each edge. The vertex figure of this honeycomb is a cube, {4,3}.

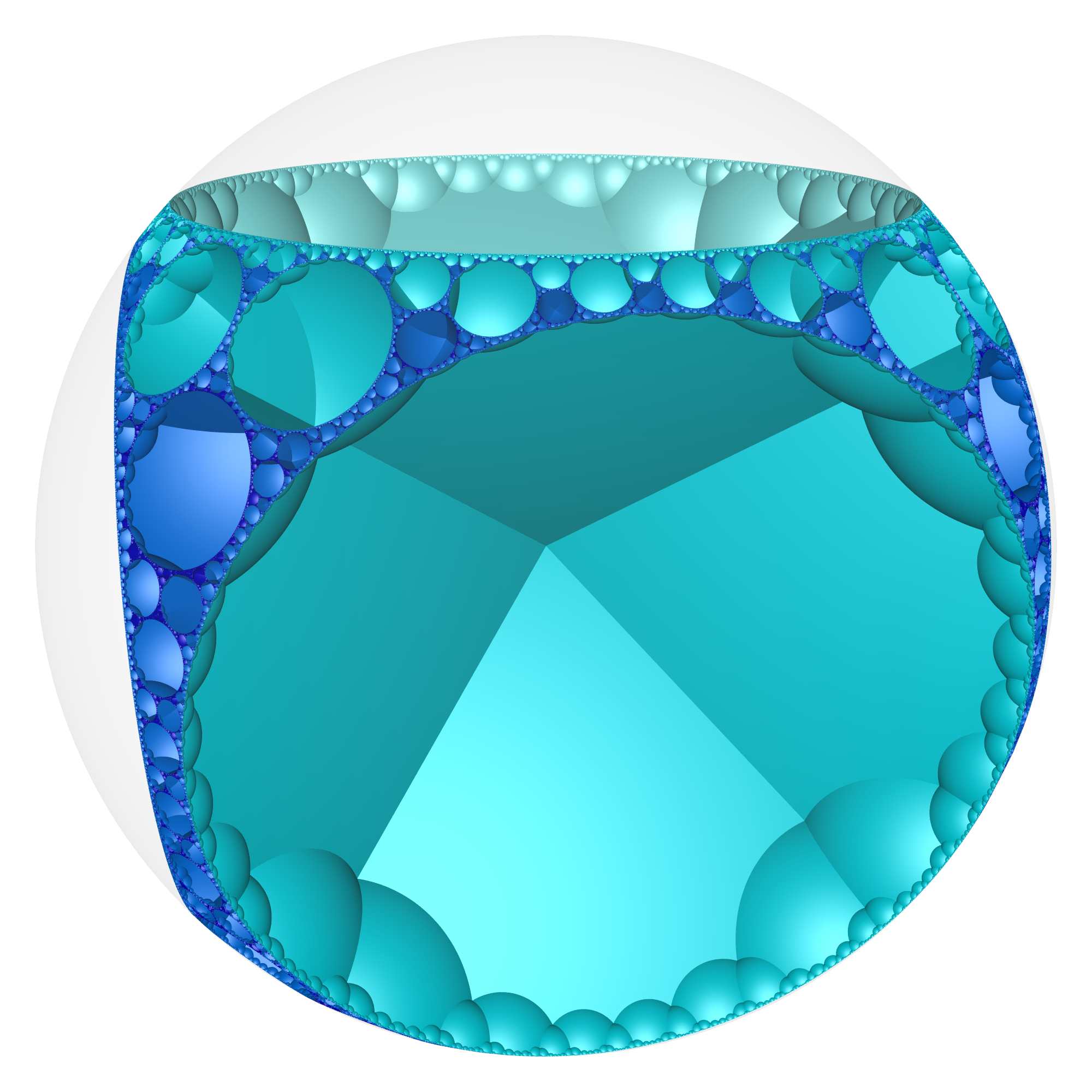
Poincaré disk model
(Vertex centered)

=== Order-4-3 apeirogonal honeycomb ===
Order-4-3 apeirogonal honeycomb
Type	Regular honeycomb
Schläfli symbol	{∞,4,3}
Coxeter diagram	
Cells	{∞,4}
Faces	Apeirogon {∞}
Vertex figure	{4,3}
Dual	{3,4,∞}
Coxeter group	[∞,4,3]
Properties	Regular

In the geometry of hyperbolic 3-space, the order-4-3 apeirogonal honeycomb or ∞,4,3 honeycomb a regular space-filling tessellation (or honeycomb). Each infinite cell consists of an apeirogonal tiling whose vertices lie on a 2-hypercycle, each of which has a limiting circle on the ideal sphere.

The Schläfli symbol of the apeirogonal tiling honeycomb is {∞,4,3}, with three apeirogonal tilings meeting at each edge. The vertex figure of this honeycomb is a cube, {4,3}.

The "ideal surface" projection below is a plane-at-infinity, in the Poincaré half-space model of H3. It shows an Apollonian gasket pattern of circles inside a largest circle.

Poincaré disk model (Vertex centered)	Ideal surface

== See also ==
- Convex uniform honeycombs in hyperbolic space
- List of regular polytopes
