= Order-5 octahedral honeycomb =

Tesselation in regular space

Order-5 octahedral honeycomb
Type	Regular honeycomb
Schläfli symbols	{3,4,5}
Coxeter diagrams	
Cells	{3,4}
Faces	{3}
Edge figure	{5}
Vertex figure	{4,5}
Dual	{5,4,3}
Coxeter group	[3,4,5]
Properties	Regular

In the geometry of hyperbolic 3-space, the order-5 octahedral honeycomb is a regular space-filling tessellation (or honeycomb) with Schläfli symbol {3,4,5}. It has five octahedra {3,4} around each edge. All vertices are ultra-ideal (existing beyond the ideal boundary) with infinitely many octahedra existing around each vertex in an order-5 square tiling vertex arrangement.

== Images ==
Poincaré disk model (cell centered)	Ideal surface

== Related polytopes and honeycombs ==
It a part of a sequence of regular polychora and honeycombs with octahedral cells: {3,4,p}

{3,4,p} polytopes
Space	S^{3}	H^{3}					
Form	Finite	Paracompact	Noncompact				
Name	{3,4,3}	{3,4,4}	{3,4,5}	{3,4,6}	{3,4,7}	{3,4,8}	... {3,4,∞}
Image							
Vertex figure	{4,3}	{4,4}	{4,5}	{4,6}	{4,7}	{4,8}	{4,∞}

=== Order-6 octahedral honeycomb ===
Order-6 octahedral honeycomb
Type	Regular honeycomb
Schläfli symbols	{3,4,6} {3,(3,4,3)}
Coxeter diagrams	=
Cells	{3,4}
Faces	{3}
Edge figure	{6}
Vertex figure	{4,6} {(4,3,4)}
Dual	{6,4,3}
Coxeter group	[3,4,6] [3,((4,3,4))]
Properties	Regular

In the geometry of hyperbolic 3-space, the order-6 octahedral honeycomb is a regular space-filling tessellation (or honeycomb) with Schläfli symbol {3,4,6}. It has six octahedra, {3,4}, around each edge. All vertices are ultra-ideal (existing beyond the ideal boundary) with infinitely many octahedra existing around each vertex in an order-6 square tiling vertex arrangement.

Poincaré disk model (cell centered)	Ideal surface

It has a second construction as a uniform honeycomb, Schläfli symbol {3,(4,3,4)}, Coxeter diagram,, with alternating types or colors of octahedral cells. In Coxeter notation the half symmetry is [3,4,6,1^{+}] = [3,((4,3,4))].

=== Order-7 octahedral honeycomb ===
Order-7 octahedral honeycomb
Type	Regular honeycomb
Schläfli symbols	{3,4,7}
Coxeter diagrams	
Cells	{3,4}
Faces	{3}
Edge figure	{7}
Vertex figure	{4,7}
Dual	{7,4,3}
Coxeter group	[3,4,7]
Properties	Regular

In the geometry of hyperbolic 3-space, the order-7 octahedral honeycomb is a regular space-filling tessellation (or honeycomb) with Schläfli symbol {3,4,7}. It has seven octahedra, {3,4}, around each edge. All vertices are ultra-ideal (existing beyond the ideal boundary) with infinitely many octahedra existing around each vertex in an order-7 square tiling vertex arrangement.

Poincaré disk model (cell centered)	Ideal surface

=== Order-8 octahedral honeycomb ===
Order-8 octahedral honeycomb
Type	Regular honeycomb
Schläfli symbols	{3,4,8}
Coxeter diagrams	
Cells	{3,4}
Faces	{3}
Edge figure	{8}
Vertex figure	{4,8}
Dual	{8,4,3}
Coxeter group	[3,4,8]
Properties	Regular

In the geometry of hyperbolic 3-space, the order-8 octahedral honeycomb is a regular space-filling tessellation (or honeycomb) with Schläfli symbol {3,4,8}. It has eight octahedra, {3,4}, around each edge. All vertices are ultra-ideal (existing beyond the ideal boundary) with infinitely many octahedra existing around each vertex in an order-8 square tiling vertex arrangement.

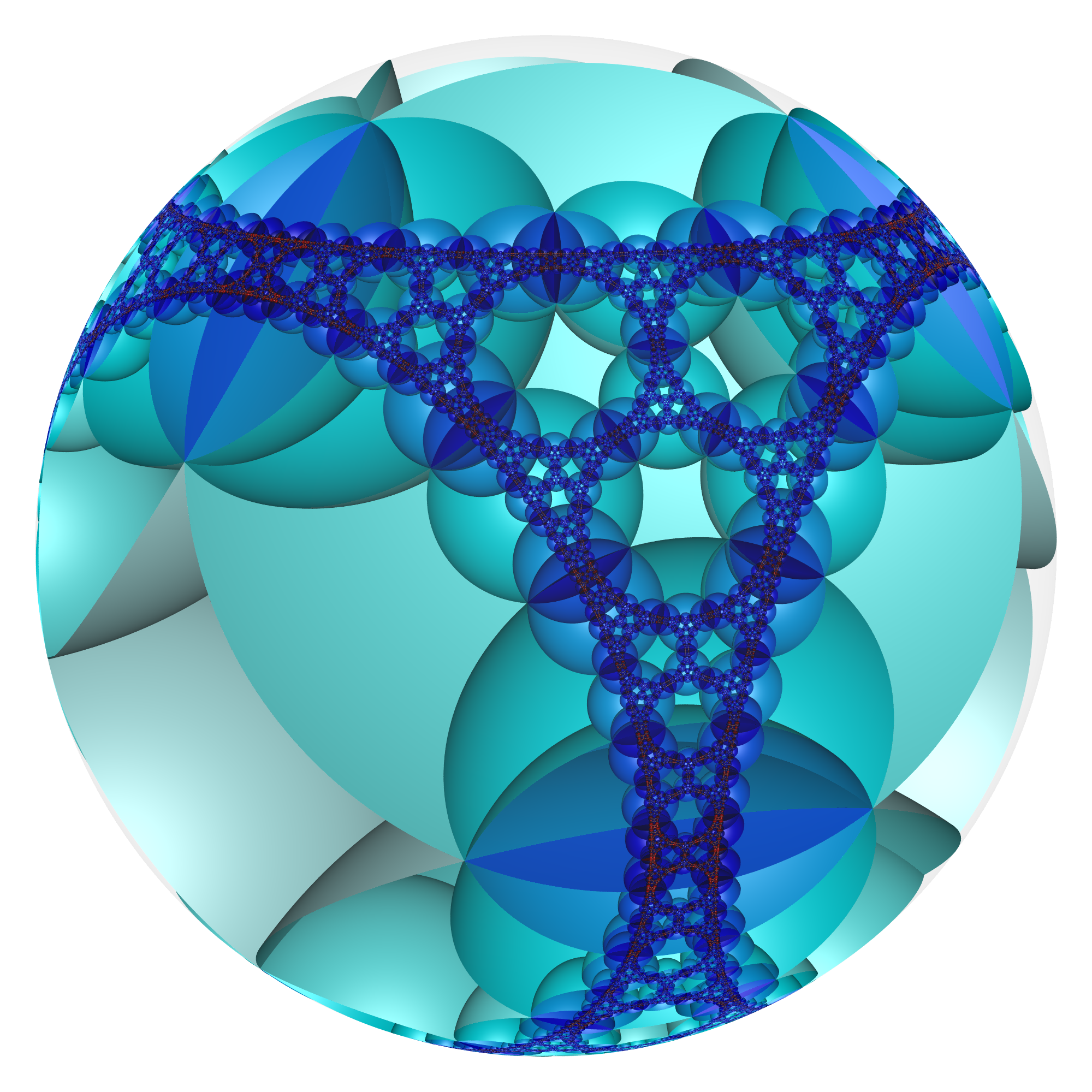
Poincaré disk model
(cell centered)

=== Infinite-order octahedral honeycomb ===
Infinite-order octahedral honeycomb
Type	Regular honeycomb
Schläfli symbols	{3,4,∞} {3,(4,∞,4)}
Coxeter diagrams	=
Cells	{3,4}
Faces	{3}
Edge figure	{∞}
Vertex figure	{4,∞} {(4,∞,4)}
Dual	{∞,4,3}
Coxeter group	[∞,4,3] [3,((4,∞,4))]
Properties	Regular

In the geometry of hyperbolic 3-space, the infinite-order octahedral honeycomb is a regular space-filling tessellation (or honeycomb) with Schläfli symbol {3,4,∞}. It has infinitely many octahedra, {3,4}, around each edge. All vertices are ultra-ideal (existing beyond the ideal boundary) with infinitely many octahedra existing around each vertex in an infinite-order square tiling vertex arrangement.

Poincaré disk model (cell centered)	Ideal surface

It has a second construction as a uniform honeycomb, Schläfli symbol {3,(4,∞,4)}, Coxeter diagram, =, with alternating types or colors of octahedral cells. In Coxeter notation the half symmetry is [3,4,∞,1^{+}] = [3,((4,∞,4))].

== See also ==
- Convex uniform honeycombs in hyperbolic space
- List of regular polytopes
