= Truncated infinite-order square tiling =

Uniform tiling of the hyperbolic plane

Infinite-order truncated square tiling
Poincaré disk model of the hyperbolic plane
| Type | Hyperbolic uniform tiling |
| Vertex configuration | ∞.8.8 |
| Schläfli symbol | t{4,∞} |
| Wythoff symbol | 2 ∞ | 4 |
| Coxeter diagram | |
| Symmetry group | [∞,4], (*∞42) |
| Dual | apeirokis apeirogonal tiling |
| Properties | Vertex-transitive |

In geometry, the truncated infinite-order square tiling is a uniform tiling of the hyperbolic plane. It has Schläfli symbol of t{4,∞}.

== Uniform color ==
In (*∞44) symmetry this tiling has 3 colors. Bisecting the isosceles triangle domains can double the symmetry to *∞42 symmetry.

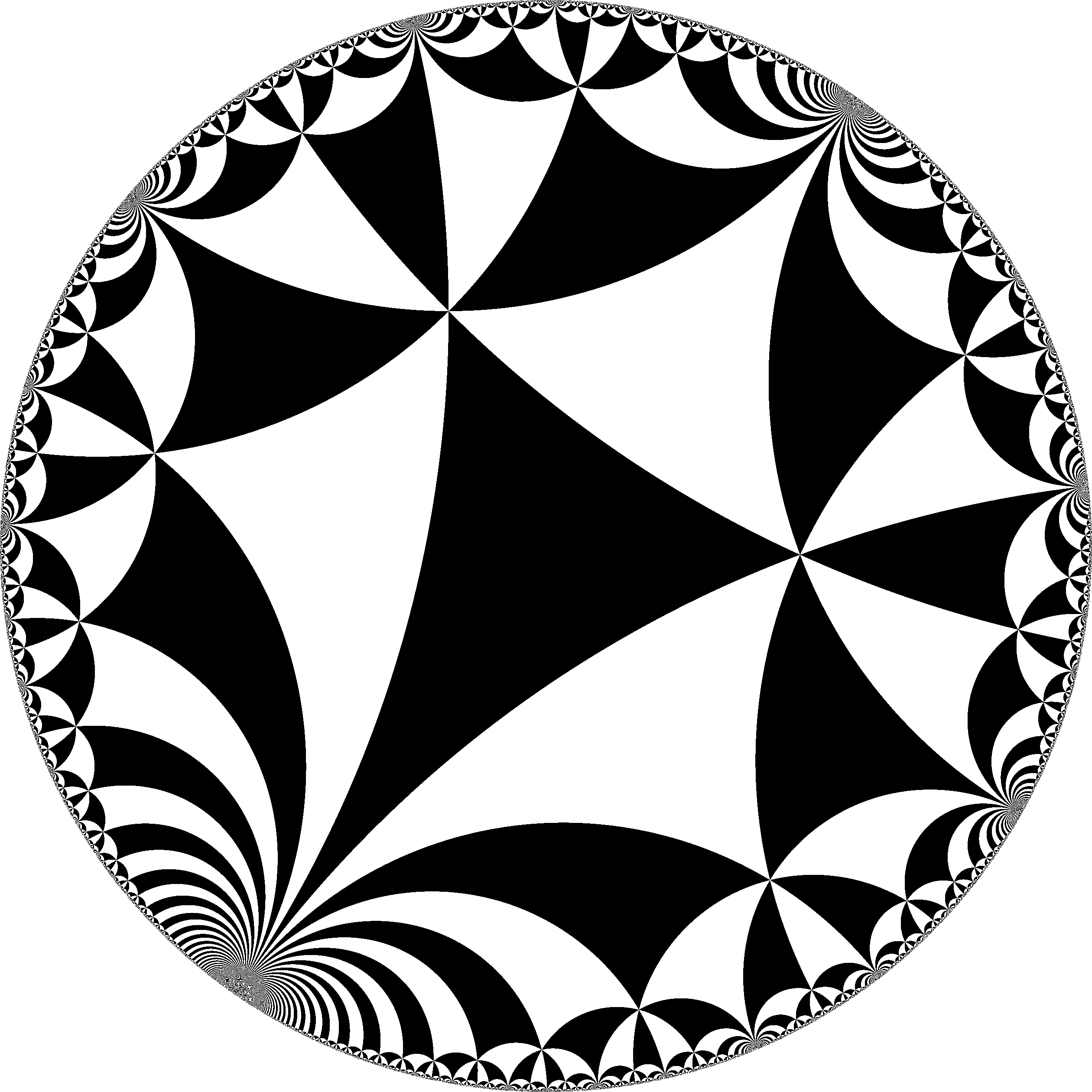
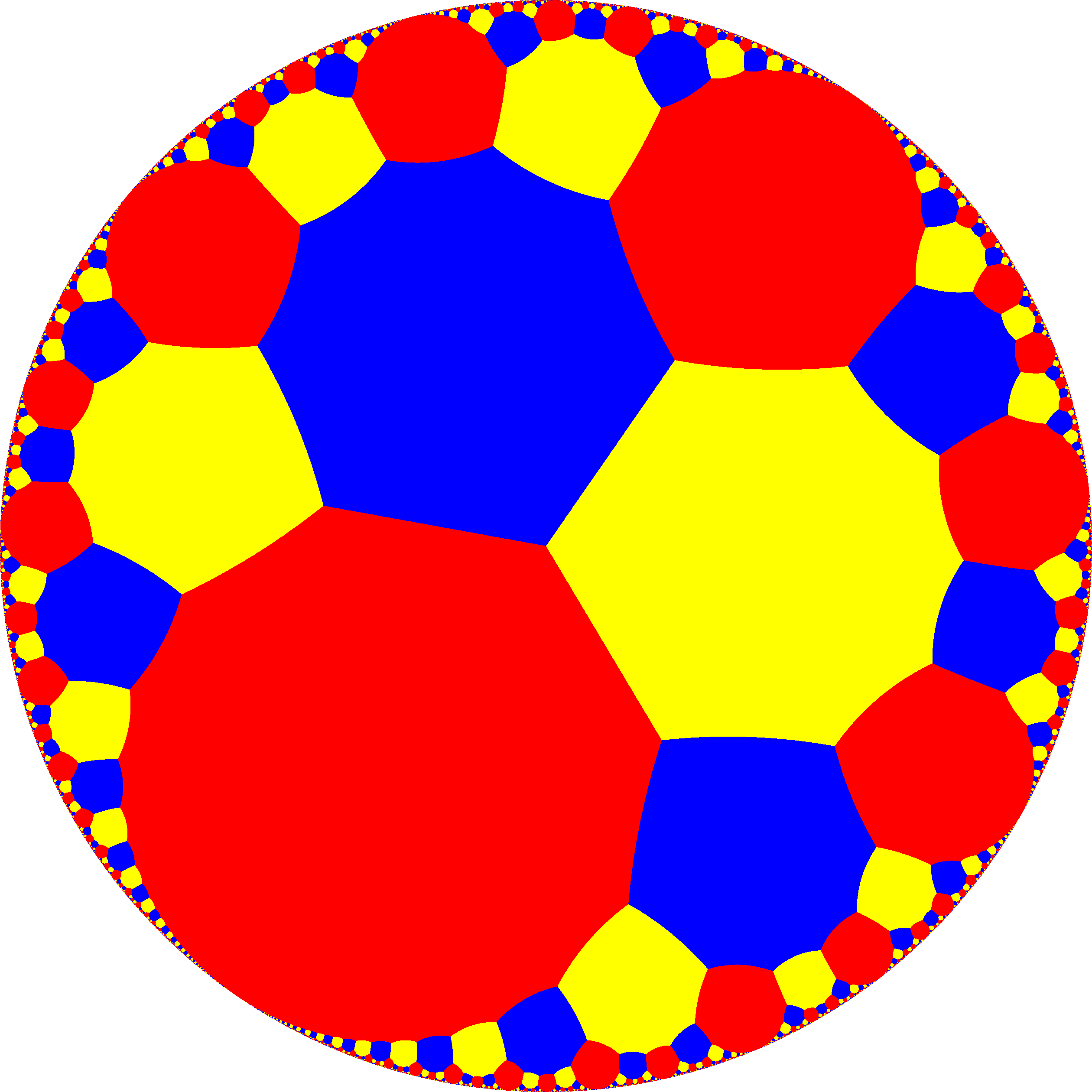

=== Symmetry ===
The dual of the tiling represents the fundamental domains of (*∞44) orbifold symmetry. From [(∞,4,4)] (*∞44) symmetry, there are 15 small index subgroup (11 unique) by mirror removal and alternation operators. Mirrors can be removed if its branch orders are all even, and cuts neighboring branch orders in half. Removing two mirrors leaves a half-order gyration point where the removed mirrors met. In these images fundamental domains are alternately colored black and white, and mirrors exist on the boundaries between colors. The symmetry can be doubled to *∞42 by adding a bisecting mirror across the fundamental domains. The subgroup index-8 group, [(1^{+},∞,1^{+},4,1^{+},4)] (∞22∞22) is the commutator subgroup of [(∞,4,4)].

Small index subgroups of [(∞,4,4)] (*∞44)
| Fundamental domains | | | | | | |
| Subgroup index | 1 | 2 | | | 4 | |
|---|---|---|---|---|---|---|
| Coxeter (orbifold) | [(4,4,∞)] (*∞44) | [(1^{+},4,4,∞)] (*∞424) | [(4,4,1^{+},∞)] (*∞424) | [(4,1^{+},4,∞)] (*∞2∞2) | [(4,1^{+},4,1^{+},∞)] 2*∞2∞2 | [(1^{+},4,4,1^{+},∞)] (∞*2222) |
| Coxeter (orbifold) | [(4,4,∞)] (*∞44) | [(4,4^{+},∞)] (4*∞2) | [(4^{+},4,∞)] (4*∞2) | [(4,4,∞^{+})] (∞*22) | [(1^{+},4,1^{+},4,∞)] 2*∞2∞2 | [(4^{+},4^{+},∞)] (∞22×) |
Rotational subgroups
| Subgroup index | 2 | 4 | | | 8 | |
| Coxeter (orbifold) | [(4,4,∞)]^{+} (∞44) | [(1^{+},4,4^{+},∞)] (∞323) | [(4^{+},4,1^{+},∞)] (∞424) | [(4,1^{+},4,∞^{+})] (∞434) | [(1^{+},4,1^{+},4,1^{+},∞)] = [(4^{+},4^{+},∞^{+})] (∞22∞22) | |

== Related polyhedra and tiling ==
*n42 symmetry mutation of truncated tilings: n.8.8
| Symmetry *n42 [n,4] | Spherical | | Euclidean | Compact hyperbolic | | | | Paracompact |
| Symmetry *n42 [n,4] | *242 [2,4] | *342 [3,4] | *442 [4,4] | *542 [5,4] | *642 [6,4] | *742 [7,4] | *842 [8,4]... | *∞42 [∞,4] |
|---|---|---|---|---|---|---|---|---|
| Truncated figures | | | | | | | | |
| Config. | 2.8.8 | 3.8.8 | 4.8.8 | 5.8.8 | 6.8.8 | 7.8.8 | 8.8.8 | ∞.8.8 |
| n-kis figures | | | | | | | | |
| Config. | V2.8.8 | V3.8.8 | V4.8.8 | V5.8.8 | V6.8.8 | V7.8.8 | V8.8.8 | V∞.8.8 |

Paracompact uniform tilings in [∞,4] family
| {∞,4} | t{∞,4} | r{∞,4} | 2t{∞,4}=t{4,∞} | 2r{∞,4}={4,∞} | rr{∞,4} | tr{∞,4} |
Dual figures
| V∞^{4} | V4.∞.∞ | V(4.∞)^{2} | V8.8.∞ | V4^{∞} | V4^{3}.∞ | V4.8.∞ |
Alternations
| [1^{+},∞,4] (*44∞) | [∞^{+},4] (∞*2) | [∞,1^{+},4] (*2∞2∞) | [∞,4^{+}] (4*∞) | [∞,4,1^{+}] (*∞∞2) | [(∞,4,2^{+})] (2*2∞) | [∞,4]^{+} (∞42) |
| = | | | | = | | |
| h{∞,4} | s{∞,4} | hr{∞,4} | s{4,∞} | h{4,∞} | hrr{∞,4} | s{∞,4} |
Alternation duals
| V(∞.4)^{4} | V3.(3.∞)^{2} | V(4.∞.4)^{2} | V3.∞.(3.4)^{2} | V∞^{∞} | V∞.4^{4} | V3.3.4.3.∞ |

== See also ==
- Uniform tilings in hyperbolic plane
- List of regular polytopes
