= Order-5 apeirogonal tiling =

Geometry term

Order-5 apeirogonal tiling
Poincaré disk model of the hyperbolic plane
Type	Hyperbolic regular tiling
Vertex configuration	∞^{5}
Schläfli symbol	{∞,5}
Wythoff symbol	5 | ∞ 2
Coxeter diagram	
Symmetry group	[∞,5], (*∞52)
Dual	Infinite-order pentagonal tiling
Properties	Vertex-transitive, edge-transitive, face-transitive edge-transitive

In geometry, the order-5 apeirogonal tiling is a regular tiling of the hyperbolic plane. It has Schläfli symbol of {∞,5}.

== Symmetry ==
The dual to this tiling represents the fundamental domains of [∞,5*] symmetry, orbifold notation *∞∞∞∞∞ symmetry, a pentagonal domain with five ideal vertices.

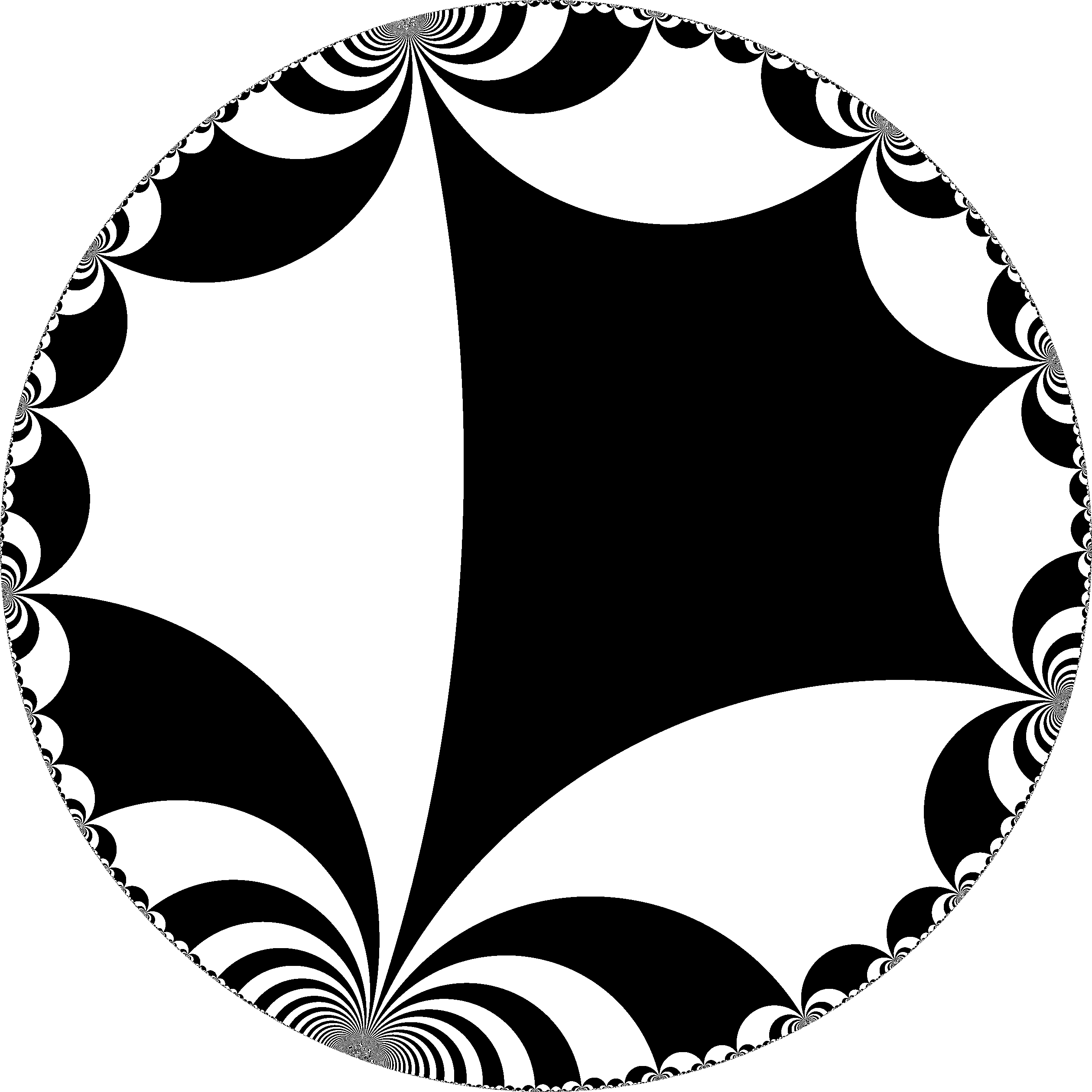

The order-5 apeirogonal tiling can be uniformly colored with 5 colored apeirogons around each vertex, and coxeter diagram:, except ultraparallel branches on the diagonals.

== Related polyhedra and tiling ==
This tiling is also topologically related as a part of sequence of regular polyhedra and tilings with five faces per vertex, starting with the icosahedron, with Schläfli symbol {n,5}, and Coxeter diagram, with n progressing to infinity.

Spherical		Hyperbolic tilings						
{2,5}	{3,5}	{4,5}	{5,5}	{6,5}	{7,5}	{8,5}	...	{∞,5}

Paracompact uniform apeirogonal/pentagonal tilings
Symmetry: [∞,5], (*∞52)							[∞,5]^{+} (∞52)	[1^{+},∞,5] (*∞55)		[∞,5^{+}] (5*∞)
{∞,5}	t{∞,5}	r{∞,5}	2t{∞,5}=t{5,∞}	2r{∞,5}={5,∞}	rr{∞,5}	tr{∞,5}	sr{∞,5}	h{∞,5}	h_{2}{∞,5}	s{5,∞}
Uniform duals
V∞^{5}	V5.∞.∞	V5.∞.5.∞	V∞.10.10	V5^{∞}	V4.5.4.∞	V4.10.∞	V3.3.5.3.∞		V(∞.5)^{5}	V3.5.3.5.3.∞

== See also ==
- Tilings of regular polygons
- List of uniform planar tilings
- List of regular polytopes
