= Order-4 apeirogonal tiling =

Regular tiling in geometry

Order-4 apeirogonal tiling
Poincaré disk model of the hyperbolic plane
Type	Hyperbolic regular tiling
Vertex configuration	∞^{4}
Schläfli symbol	{∞,4} r{∞,∞} t(∞,∞,∞) t_{0,1,2,3}(∞,∞,∞,∞)
Wythoff symbol	4 | ∞ 2; 2 | ∞ ∞ ∞ ∞ | ∞
Coxeter diagram	
Symmetry group	[∞,4], (*∞42) [∞,∞], (*∞∞2) [(∞,∞,∞)], (*∞∞∞) (*∞∞∞∞)
Dual	Infinite-order square tiling
Properties	Vertex-transitive, edge-transitive, face-transitive edge-transitive

In geometry, the order-4 apeirogonal tiling is a regular tiling of the hyperbolic plane. It covers the hyperbolic plane, which is a non-Euclidean surface with constant negative curvature, with a repeating pattern of congruent shapes that fill the plane completely without gaps or overlaps.

This tiling is made from apeirogons, which are polygons with infinitely many sides. In this pattern, four apeirogons meet at each vertex. It can be understood as the hyperbolic analogue of the square tiling of the Euclidean plane, where four squares meet at each vertex. Its Schläfli symbol is {∞,4}, meaning that each face has infinitely many sides and four faces meet at every vertex.

== Symmetry ==
This tiling shows the mirror lines of the symmetry group written in orbifold notation as *2∞. Its dual tiling corresponds to the fundamental domains of the symmetry group written as *∞∞∞∞. In that case, the fundamental domain is a square with four ideal vertices.

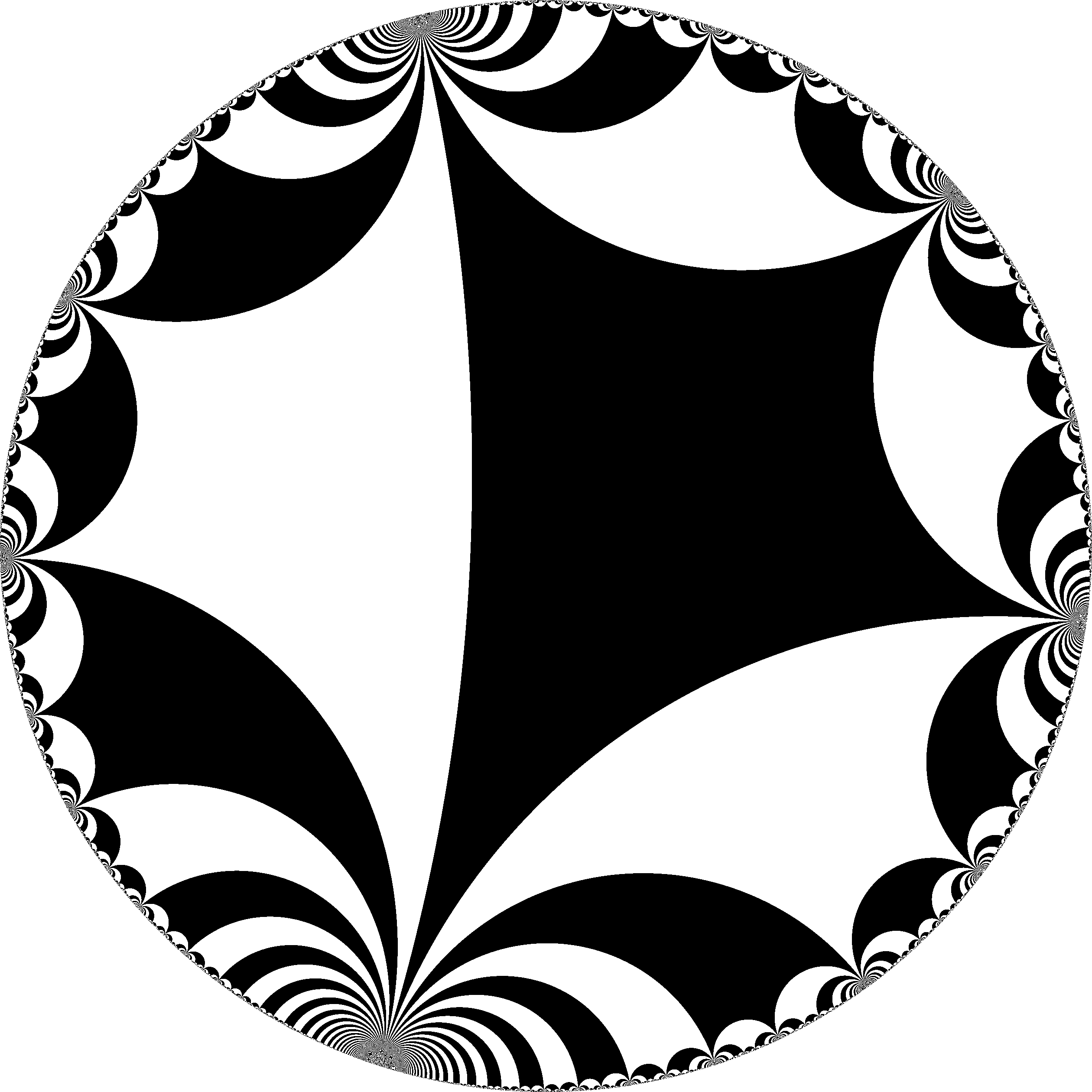

== Uniform colorings ==
As in the Euclidean square tiling, this tiling has nine uniform colorings. Three of these arise from triangular reflective symmetry domains. A fourth comes from square symmetry written as *∞∞∞∞, with four different colors meeting at each vertex. The checkerboard coloring, denoted r{∞,∞}, defines the fundamental domains of the symmetry group written as [(∞,4,4)] or *∞44, and is usually shown as alternating black and white regions corresponding to reflections.

1 color	2 color	3 and 2 colors		4, 3 and 2 colors		
[∞,4], (*∞42)	[∞,∞], (*∞∞2)	[(∞,∞,∞)], (*∞∞∞)		(*∞∞∞∞)		
{∞,4}	r{∞,∞} = {∞,4}1/2	t_{0,2}(∞,∞,∞) = r{∞,∞}1/2		t_{0,1,2,3}(∞,∞,∞,∞) = r{∞,∞}1/4 = {∞,4}1/8		
(1111)	(1212)	(1213)	(1112)	(1234)	(1123)	(1122)
	=	= =		= =		

== Related polyhedra and tiling ==
This tiling is also related to a sequence of regular polyhedra and tilings where four faces meet at each vertex. The sequence starts with the octahedron, which has the Schläfli symbol {n,4}, and a corresponding Coxeter diagram, and continues with larger tilings as n increases toward infinity.

*n42 symmetry mutation of regular tilings: {n,4}
Spherical		Euclidean	Hyperbolic tilings				
2^{4}	3^{4}	4^{4}	5^{4}	6^{4}	7^{4}	8^{4}	...∞^{4}

Paracompact uniform tilings in [∞,4] family
{∞,4}	t{∞,4}	r{∞,4}	2t{∞,4}=t{4,∞}	2r{∞,4}={4,∞}	rr{∞,4}	tr{∞,4}
Dual figures
V∞^{4}	V4.∞.∞	V(4.∞)^{2}	V8.8.∞	V4^{∞}	V4^{3}.∞	V4.8.∞
Alternations
[1^{+},∞,4] (*44∞)	[∞^{+},4] (∞*2)	[∞,1^{+},4] (*2∞2∞)	[∞,4^{+}] (4*∞)	[∞,4,1^{+}] (*∞∞2)	[(∞,4,2^{+})] (2*2∞)	[∞,4]^{+} (∞42)
=				=		
h{∞,4}	s{∞,4}	hr{∞,4}	s{4,∞}	h{4,∞}	hrr{∞,4}	s{∞,4}
Alternation duals
V(∞.4)^{4}	V3.(3.∞)^{2}	V(4.∞.4)^{2}	V3.∞.(3.4)^{2}	V∞^{∞}	V∞.4^{4}	V3.3.4.3.∞

Paracompact uniform tilings in [∞,∞] family
= =	= =	= =	= =	= =	=	=
{∞,∞}	t{∞,∞}	r{∞,∞}	2t{∞,∞}=t{∞,∞}	2r{∞,∞}={∞,∞}	rr{∞,∞}	tr{∞,∞}
Dual tilings
V∞^{∞}	V∞.∞.∞	V(∞.∞)^{2}	V∞.∞.∞	V∞^{∞}	V4.∞.4.∞	V4.4.∞
Alternations
[1^{+},∞,∞] (*∞∞2)	[∞^{+},∞] (∞*∞)	[∞,1^{+},∞] (*∞∞∞∞)	[∞,∞^{+}] (∞*∞)	[∞,∞,1^{+}] (*∞∞2)	[(∞,∞,2^{+})] (2*∞∞)	[∞,∞]^{+} (2∞∞)
h{∞,∞}	s{∞,∞}	hr{∞,∞}	s{∞,∞}	h_{2}{∞,∞}	hrr{∞,∞}	sr{∞,∞}
Alternation duals
V(∞.∞)^{∞}	V(3.∞)^{3}	V(∞.4)^{4}	V(3.∞)^{3}	V∞^{∞}	V(4.∞.4)^{2}	V3.3.∞.3.∞

Paracompact uniform tilings in [(∞,∞,∞)] family
(∞,∞,∞) h{∞,∞}	r(∞,∞,∞) h_{2}{∞,∞}	(∞,∞,∞) h{∞,∞}	r(∞,∞,∞) h_{2}{∞,∞}	(∞,∞,∞) h{∞,∞}	r(∞,∞,∞) r{∞,∞}	t(∞,∞,∞) t{∞,∞}
Dual tilings
V∞^{∞}	V∞.∞.∞.∞	V∞^{∞}	V∞.∞.∞.∞	V∞^{∞}	V∞.∞.∞.∞	V∞.∞.∞
Alternations
[(1^{+},∞,∞,∞)] (*∞∞∞∞)	[∞^{+},∞,∞)] (∞*∞)	[∞,1^{+},∞,∞)] (*∞∞∞∞)	[∞,∞^{+},∞)] (∞*∞)	[(∞,∞,∞,1^{+})] (*∞∞∞∞)	[(∞,∞,∞^{+})] (∞*∞)	[∞,∞,∞)]^{+} (∞∞∞)
Alternation duals
V(∞.∞)^{∞}	V(∞.4)^{4}	V(∞.∞)^{∞}	V(∞.4)^{4}	V(∞.∞)^{∞}	V(∞.4)^{4}	V3.∞.3.∞.3.∞

== See also ==
- Tilings of regular polygons
- List of uniform planar tilings
- List of regular polytopes
