= Infinite-order apeirogonal tiling =

Pattern on the hyperbolic plane

Infinite-order apeirogonal tiling
Poincaré disk model of the hyperbolic plane
Type	Hyperbolic regular tiling
Vertex configuration	∞^{∞}
Schläfli symbol	{∞,∞}
Wythoff symbol	∞ | ∞ 2 ∞ ∞ | ∞
Coxeter diagram	
Symmetry group	[∞,∞], (*∞∞2) [(∞,∞,∞)], (*∞∞∞)
Dual	self-dual
Properties	Vertex-transitive, edge-transitive, face-transitive

The infinite-order apeirogonal tiling is a regular tiling of the hyperbolic plane. It has Schläfli symbol of {∞,∞}, which means it has countably infinitely many apeirogons around all its ideal vertices.

== Symmetry ==
This tiling represents the fundamental domains of *∞^{∞} symmetry.

== Uniform colorings ==
This tiling can also be alternately colored in the [(∞,∞,∞)] symmetry from 3 generator positions.

Domains	0	1	2
symmetry: [(∞,∞,∞)]	t_{0}{(∞,∞,∞)}	t_{1}{(∞,∞,∞)}	t_{2}{(∞,∞,∞)}

== Related polyhedra and tiling ==
The union of this tiling and its dual can be seen as orthogonal red and blue lines here, and combined define the lines of a *2∞2∞ fundamental domain.

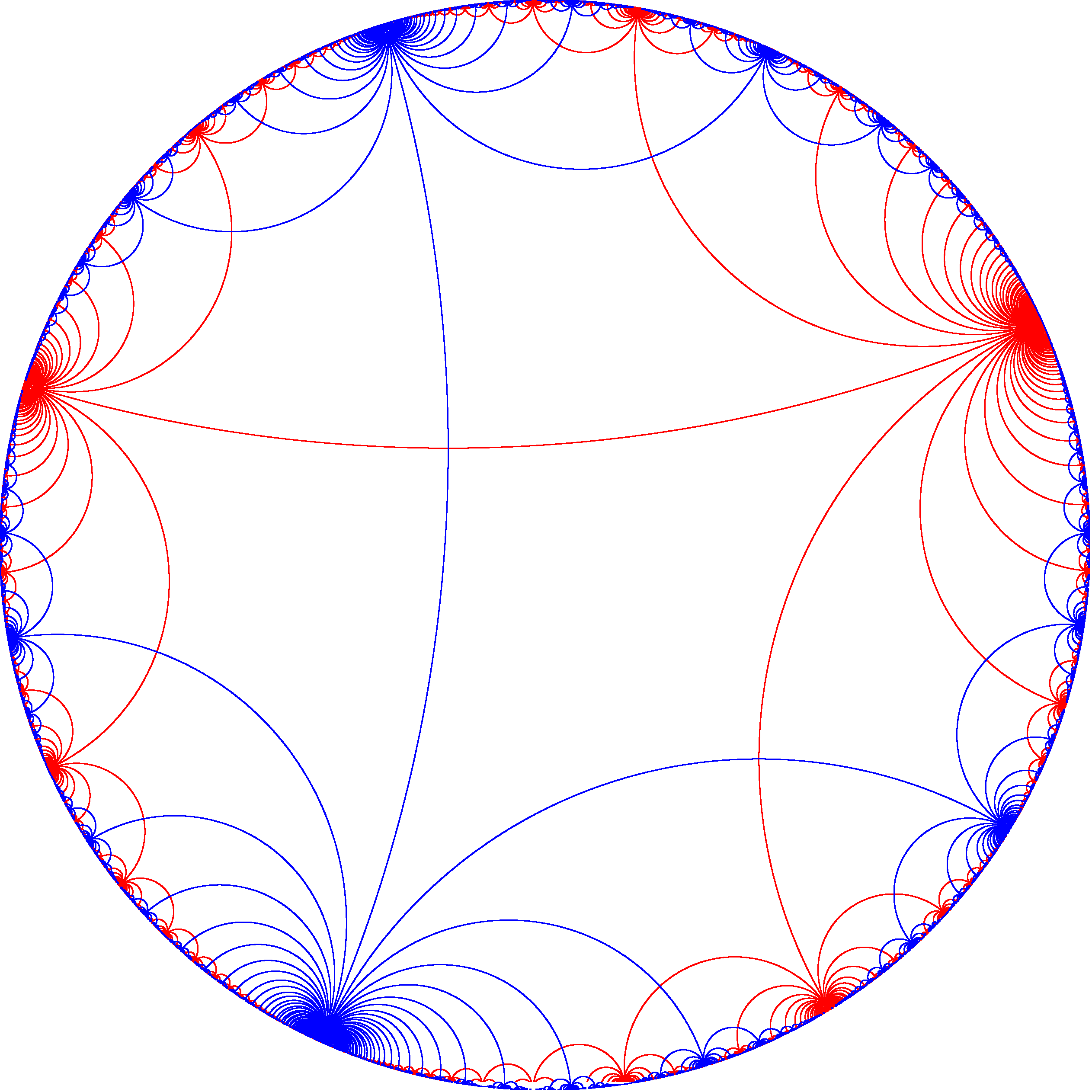
a{∞,∞} or = ∪

Paracompact uniform tilings in [∞,∞] family
= =	= =	= =	= =	= =	=	=
{∞,∞}	t{∞,∞}	r{∞,∞}	2t{∞,∞}=t{∞,∞}	2r{∞,∞}={∞,∞}	rr{∞,∞}	tr{∞,∞}
Dual tilings
V∞^{∞}	V∞.∞.∞	V(∞.∞)^{2}	V∞.∞.∞	V∞^{∞}	V4.∞.4.∞	V4.4.∞
Alternations
[1^{+},∞,∞] (*∞∞2)	[∞^{+},∞] (∞*∞)	[∞,1^{+},∞] (*∞∞∞∞)	[∞,∞^{+}] (∞*∞)	[∞,∞,1^{+}] (*∞∞2)	[(∞,∞,2^{+})] (2*∞∞)	[∞,∞]^{+} (2∞∞)
h{∞,∞}	s{∞,∞}	hr{∞,∞}	s{∞,∞}	h_{2}{∞,∞}	hrr{∞,∞}	sr{∞,∞}
Alternation duals
V(∞.∞)^{∞}	V(3.∞)^{3}	V(∞.4)^{4}	V(3.∞)^{3}	V∞^{∞}	V(4.∞.4)^{2}	V3.3.∞.3.∞

Paracompact uniform tilings in [(∞,∞,∞)] family
(∞,∞,∞) h{∞,∞}	r(∞,∞,∞) h_{2}{∞,∞}	(∞,∞,∞) h{∞,∞}	r(∞,∞,∞) h_{2}{∞,∞}	(∞,∞,∞) h{∞,∞}	r(∞,∞,∞) r{∞,∞}	t(∞,∞,∞) t{∞,∞}
Dual tilings
V∞^{∞}	V∞.∞.∞.∞	V∞^{∞}	V∞.∞.∞.∞	V∞^{∞}	V∞.∞.∞.∞	V∞.∞.∞
Alternations
[(1^{+},∞,∞,∞)] (*∞∞∞∞)	[∞^{+},∞,∞)] (∞*∞)	[∞,1^{+},∞,∞)] (*∞∞∞∞)	[∞,∞^{+},∞)] (∞*∞)	[(∞,∞,∞,1^{+})] (*∞∞∞∞)	[(∞,∞,∞^{+})] (∞*∞)	[∞,∞,∞)]^{+} (∞∞∞)
Alternation duals
V(∞.∞)^{∞}	V(∞.4)^{4}	V(∞.∞)^{∞}	V(∞.4)^{4}	V(∞.∞)^{∞}	V(∞.4)^{4}	V3.∞.3.∞.3.∞

== See also ==
- Tilings of regular polygons
- List of uniform planar tilings
- List of regular polytopes
