= Truncated infinite-order triangular tiling =

Geometry term

Infinite-order truncated triangular tiling
Poincaré disk model of the hyperbolic plane
Type	Hyperbolic uniform tiling
Vertex configuration	∞.6.6
Schläfli symbol	t{3,∞}
Wythoff symbol	2 ∞ | 3
Coxeter diagram	
Symmetry group	[∞,3], (*∞32)
Dual	apeirokis apeirogonal tiling
Properties	Vertex-transitive

In geometry, the truncated infinite-order triangular tiling is a uniform tiling of the hyperbolic plane with a Schläfli symbol of t{3,∞}.

== Symmetry ==
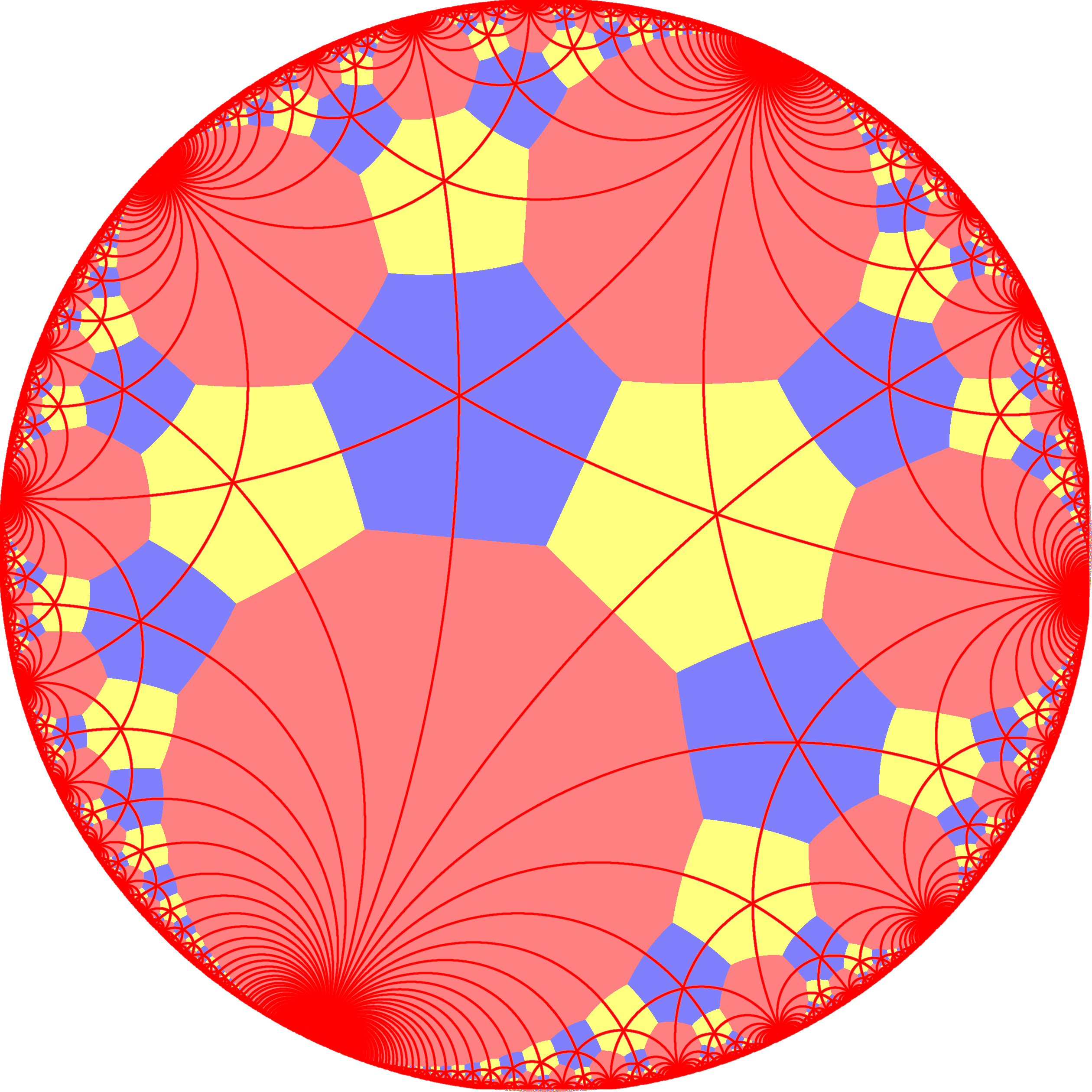
Truncated infinite-order triangular tiling with mirror lines,.

The dual of this tiling represents the fundamental domains of *∞33 symmetry. There are no mirror removal subgroups of [(∞,3,3)], but this symmetry group can be doubled to ∞32 symmetry by adding a mirror.

Small index subgroups of [(∞,3,3)], (*∞33)
Type	Reflectional	Rotational
Index	1	2
Diagram		
Coxeter (orbifold)	[(∞,3,3)] (*∞33)	[(∞,3,3)]^{+} (∞33)

== Related polyhedra and tiling ==
This hyperbolic tiling is topologically related as a part of sequence of uniform truncated polyhedra with vertex configurations (6.n.n), and [n,3] Coxeter group symmetry.

*n32 symmetry mutation of truncated tilings: n.6.6
Sym. *n42 [n,3]	Spherical				Euclid.	Compact		Parac.	Noncompact hyperbolic		
Sym. *n42 [n,3]	*232 [2,3]	*332 [3,3]	*432 [4,3]	*532 [5,3]	*632 [6,3]	*732 [7,3]	*832 [8,3]...	*∞32 [∞,3]	[12i,3]	[9i,3]	[6i,3]
Truncated figures											
Config.	2.6.6	3.6.6	4.6.6	5.6.6	6.6.6	7.6.6	8.6.6	∞.6.6	12i.6.6	9i.6.6	6i.6.6
n-kis figures											
Config.	V2.6.6	V3.6.6	V4.6.6	V5.6.6	V6.6.6	V7.6.6	V8.6.6	V∞.6.6	V12i.6.6	V9i.6.6	V6i.6.6

Paracompact uniform tilings in [∞,3] family
Symmetry: [∞,3], (*∞32)							[∞,3]^{+} (∞32)	[1^{+},∞,3] (*∞33)		[∞,3^{+}] (3*∞)
		=	=	=				= or	= or	=
{∞,3}	t{∞,3}	r{∞,3}	t{3,∞}	{3,∞}	rr{∞,3}	tr{∞,3}	sr{∞,3}	h{∞,3}	h_{2}{∞,3}	s{3,∞}
Uniform duals
V∞^{3}	V3.∞.∞	V(3.∞)^{2}	V6.6.∞	V3^{∞}	V4.3.4.∞	V4.6.∞	V3.3.3.3.∞	V(3.∞)^{3}		V3.3.3.3.3.∞

Paracompact hyperbolic uniform tilings in [(∞,3,3)] family
Symmetry: [(∞,3,3)], (*∞33)							[(∞,3,3)]^{+}, (∞33)
(∞,∞,3)	t_{0,1}(∞,3,3)	t_{1}(∞,3,3)	t_{1,2}(∞,3,3)	t_{2}(∞,3,3)	t_{0,2}(∞,3,3)	t_{0,1,2}(∞,3,3)	s(∞,3,3)
Dual tilings
V(3.∞)^{3}	V3.∞.3.∞	V(3.∞)^{3}	V3.6.∞.6	V(3.3)^{∞}	V3.6.∞.6	V6.6.∞	V3.3.3.3.3.∞

== See also ==
- List of uniform planar tilings
- Tilings of regular polygons
- Uniform tilings in hyperbolic plane
