= Truncated order-4 heptagonal tiling =

Uniform tiling of the hyperbolic plane

Truncated heptagonal tiling
Poincaré disk model of the hyperbolic plane
Type	Hyperbolic uniform tiling
Vertex configuration	4.14.14
Schläfli symbol	t{7,4}
Wythoff symbol	2 4 | 7; 2 7 7 |
Coxeter diagram	or
Symmetry group	[7,4], (*742) [7,7], (*772)
Dual	Order-7 tetrakis square tiling
Properties	Vertex-transitive

In geometry, the truncated order-4 heptagonal tiling is a uniform tiling of the hyperbolic plane. It has Schläfli symbol of t{7,4}.

== Constructions ==
There are two uniform constructions of this tiling, first by the [7,4] kaleidoscope, and second by removing the last mirror, [7,4,1^{+}], gives [7,7], (*772).

Two uniform constructions of 4.7.4.7
Name	Tetraheptagonal	Truncated heptaheptagonal
Image		
Symmetry	[7,4] (*742)	[7,7] = [7,4,1^{+}] (*772) =
Symbol	t{7,4}	tr{7,7}
Coxeter diagram		

== Symmetry ==
There is only one simple subgroup [7,7]^{+}, index 2, removing all the mirrors. This symmetry can be doubled to 742 symmetry by adding a bisecting mirror.

Small index subgroups of [7,7]
Type	Reflectional	Rotational
Index	1	2
Diagram		
Coxeter (orbifold)	[7,7] = (*772)	[7,7]^{+} = (772)

== Related polyhedra and tiling ==
*n42 symmetry mutation of truncated tilings: 4.2n.2n
Symmetry *n42 [n,4]	Spherical		Euclidean	Compact hyperbolic				Paracomp.
Symmetry *n42 [n,4]	*242 [2,4]	*342 [3,4]	*442 [4,4]	*542 [5,4]	*642 [6,4]	*742 [7,4]	*842 [8,4]...	*∞42 [∞,4]
Truncated figures								
Config.	4.4.4	4.6.6	4.8.8	4.10.10	4.12.12	4.14.14	4.16.16	4.∞.∞
n-kis figures								
Config.	V4.4.4	V4.6.6	V4.8.8	V4.10.10	V4.12.12	V4.14.14	V4.16.16	V4.∞.∞

Uniform heptagonal/square tilings
Symmetry: [7,4], (*742)							[7,4]^{+}, (742)	[7^{+},4], (7*2)	[7,4,1^{+}], (*772)
{7,4}	t{7,4}	r{7,4}	2t{7,4}=t{4,7}	2r{7,4}={4,7}	rr{7,4}	tr{7,4}	sr{7,4}	s{7,4}	h{4,7}
Uniform duals
V7^{4}	V4.14.14	V4.7.4.7	V7.8.8	V4^{7}	V4.4.7.4	V4.8.14	V3.3.4.3.7	V3.3.7.3.7	V7^{7}

Uniform heptaheptagonal tilings
Symmetry: [7,7], (*772)							[7,7]^{+}, (772)
= =	= =	= =	= =	= =	= =	= =	= =
{7,7}	t{7,7}	r{7,7}	2t{7,7}=t{7,7}	2r{7,7}={7,7}	rr{7,7}	tr{7,7}	sr{7,7}
Uniform duals
V7^{7}	V7.14.14	V7.7.7.7	V7.14.14	V7^{7}	V4.7.4.7	V4.14.14	V3.3.7.3.7

== See also ==
- Uniform tilings in hyperbolic plane
- List of regular polytopes
