= Truncated order-5 pentagonal tiling =

Type of uniform tiling in geometry

Truncated order-5 pentagonal tiling
Poincaré disk model of the hyperbolic plane
| Type | Hyperbolic uniform tiling |
| Vertex configuration | 5.10.10 |
| Schläfli symbol | t{5,5} |
| Wythoff symbol | 2 5 | 5 |
| Coxeter diagram | |
| Symmetry group | [5,5], (*552) |
| Dual | Order-5 pentakis pentagonal tiling |
| Properties | Vertex-transitive |

In geometry, the truncated order-5 pentagonal tiling is a regular tiling of the hyperbolic plane. It has Schläfli symbol of t_{0,1}{5,5}, constructed from one pentagons and two decagons around every vertex.

== Related tilings ==
Uniform pentapentagonal tilings
| Symmetry: [5,5], (*552) | | | | | | | [5,5]^{+}, (552) |
|---|---|---|---|---|---|---|---|
| = | = | = | = | = | = | = | = |
| Order-5 pentagonal tiling {5,5} | Truncated order-5 pentagonal tiling t{5,5} | Order-4 pentagonal tiling r{5,5} | Truncated order-5 pentagonal tiling 2t{5,5} = t{5,5} | Order-5 pentagonal tiling 2r{5,5} = {5,5} | Tetrapentagonal tiling rr{5,5} | Truncated order-4 pentagonal tiling tr{5,5} | Snub pentapentagonal tiling sr{5,5} |
Uniform duals
| Order-5 pentagonal tiling V5.5.5.5.5 | V5.10.10 | Order-5 square tiling V5.5.5.5 | V5.10.10 | Order-5 pentagonal tiling V5.5.5.5.5 | V4.5.4.5 | V4.10.10 | V3.3.5.3.5 |

== See also ==
- Square tiling
- Uniform tilings in hyperbolic plane
- List of regular polytopes
