= Infinite-order square tiling =

Tiling method in hyperbolic geometry

Infinite-order square tiling
Poincaré disk model of the hyperbolic plane
| Type | Hyperbolic regular tiling |
| Vertex configuration | 4^{∞} |
| Schläfli symbol | {4,∞} |
| Wythoff symbol | ∞ | 4 2 |
| Coxeter diagram | |
| Symmetry group | [∞,4], (*∞42) |
| Dual | Order-4 apeirogonal tiling |
| Properties | Vertex-transitive, edge-transitive, face-transitive |

In geometry, the infinite-order square tiling is a regular tiling of the hyperbolic plane. It has Schläfli symbol of {4,∞}. All vertices are ideal, located at "infinity", seen on the boundary of the Poincaré hyperbolic disk projection.

== Uniform colorings ==
There is a half symmetry form,, seen with alternating colors:

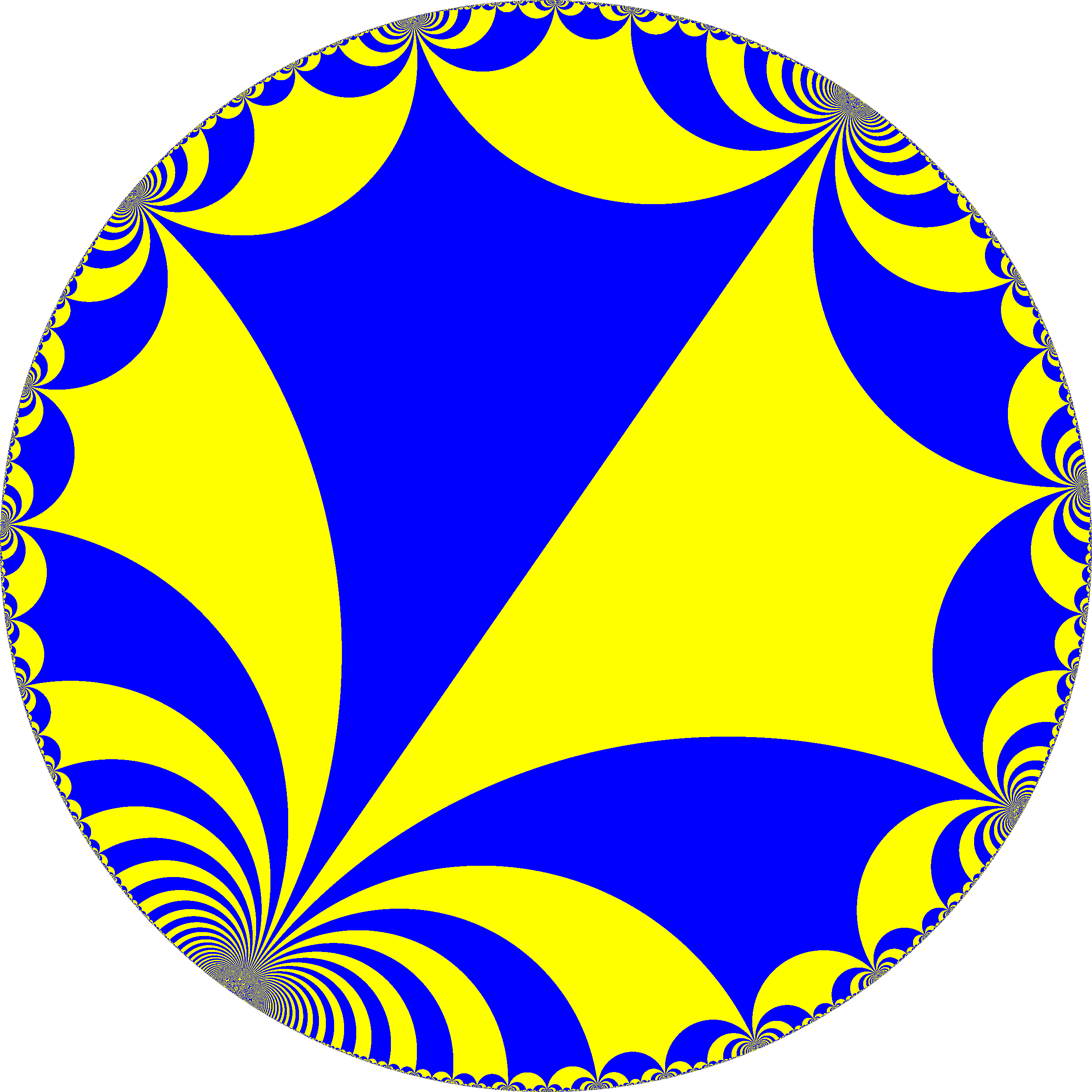

== Symmetry ==
This tiling represents the mirror lines of *∞∞∞∞ symmetry. The dual to this tiling defines the fundamental domains of (*2^{∞}) orbifold symmetry.

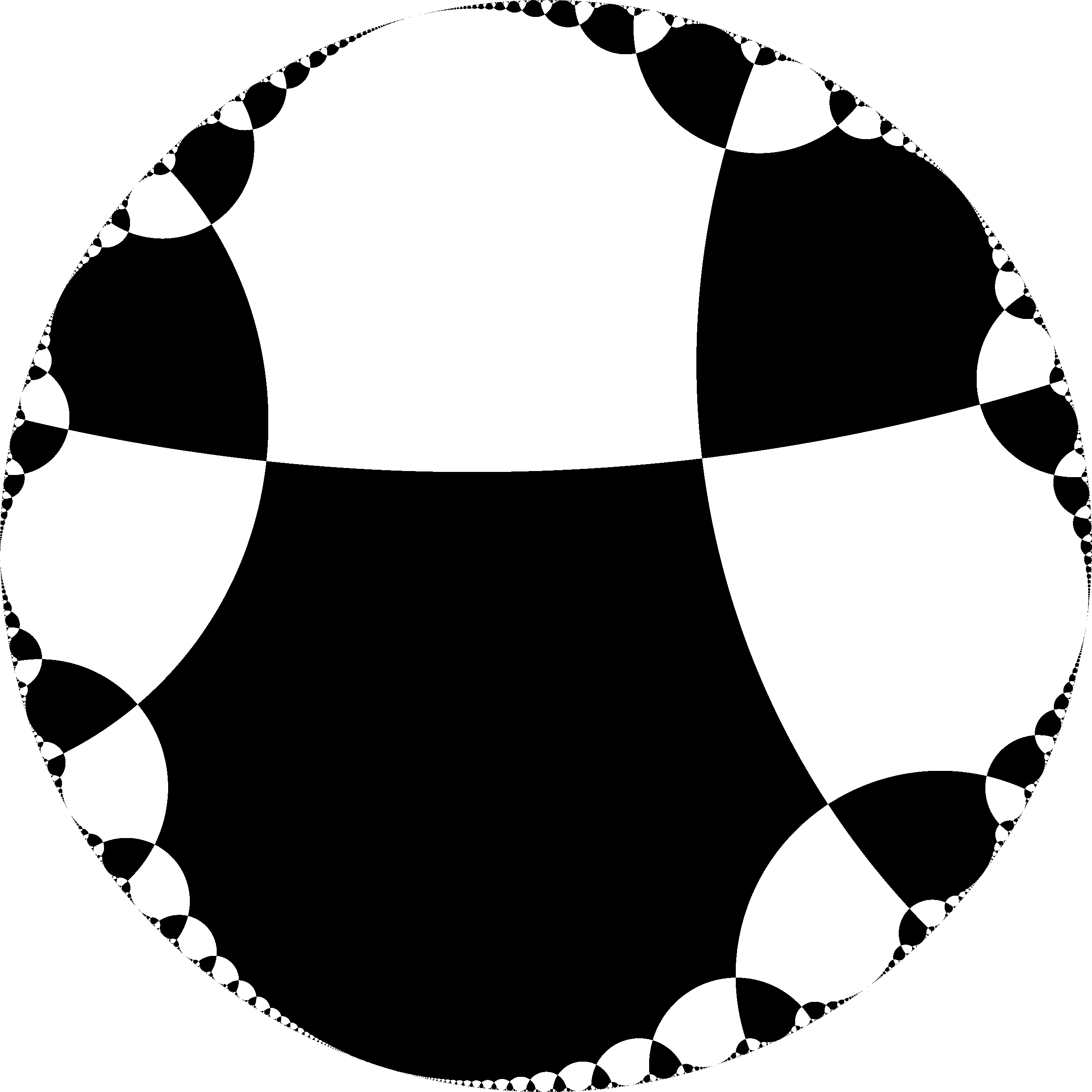

== Related polyhedra and tiling ==
This tiling is topologically related as a part of sequence of regular polyhedra and tilings with vertex figure (4^{n}).

*n42 symmetry mutation of regular tilings: {4,n}
| Spherical | Euclidean | Compact hyperbolic | | | | Paracompact |
|---|---|---|---|---|---|---|
| {4,3} | {4,4} | {4,5} | {4,6} | {4,7} | {4,8}... | {4,∞} |

Paracompact uniform tilings in [∞,4] family
| {∞,4} | t{∞,4} | r{∞,4} | 2t{∞,4}=t{4,∞} | 2r{∞,4}={4,∞} | rr{∞,4} | tr{∞,4} |
Dual figures
| V∞^{4} | V4.∞.∞ | V(4.∞)^{2} | V8.8.∞ | V4^{∞} | V4^{3}.∞ | V4.8.∞ |
Alternations
| [1^{+},∞,4] (*44∞) | [∞^{+},4] (∞*2) | [∞,1^{+},4] (*2∞2∞) | [∞,4^{+}] (4*∞) | [∞,4,1^{+}] (*∞∞2) | [(∞,4,2^{+})] (2*2∞) | [∞,4]^{+} (∞42) |
| = | | | | = | | |
| h{∞,4} | s{∞,4} | hr{∞,4} | s{4,∞} | h{4,∞} | hrr{∞,4} | s{∞,4} |
Alternation duals
| V(∞.4)^{4} | V3.(3.∞)^{2} | V(4.∞.4)^{2} | V3.∞.(3.4)^{2} | V∞^{∞} | V∞.4^{4} | V3.3.4.3.∞ |

== See also ==
- Square tiling
- Uniform tilings in hyperbolic plane
- List of regular polytopes
