= Truncated order-7 heptagonal tiling =

Regular pattern for geometric tiling

Truncated order-7 heptagonal tiling
Poincaré disk model of the hyperbolic plane
Type	Hyperbolic uniform tiling
Vertex configuration	7.14.14
Schläfli symbol	t{7,7}
Wythoff symbol	2 7 | 7
Coxeter diagram	
Symmetry group	[7,7], (*772)
Dual	Order-7 heptakis heptagonal tiling
Properties	Vertex-transitive

In geometry, the truncated order-7 heptagonal tiling is a uniform tiling of the hyperbolic plane. It has Schläfli symbol of t_{0,1}{7,7}, constructed from one heptagon and two tetrakaidecagons around every vertex.

== Related tilings ==
Uniform heptaheptagonal tilings
Symmetry: [7,7], (*772)							[7,7]^{+}, (772)
= =	= =	= =	= =	= =	= =	= =	= =
{7,7}	t{7,7}	r{7,7}	2t{7,7}=t{7,7}	2r{7,7}={7,7}	rr{7,7}	tr{7,7}	sr{7,7}
Uniform duals
V7^{7}	V7.14.14	V7.7.7.7	V7.14.14	V7^{7}	V4.7.4.7	V4.14.14	V3.3.7.3.7

== See also ==
- Square tiling
- Uniform tilings in hyperbolic plane
- List of regular polytopes
