= Infinite-order pentagonal tiling =

Regular tiling of the hyperbolic plane

Infinite-order pentagonal tiling
Poincaré disk model of the hyperbolic plane
Type	Hyperbolic regular tiling
Vertex configuration	5^{∞}
Schläfli symbol	{5,∞}
Wythoff symbol	∞ | 5 2
Coxeter diagram	
Symmetry group	[∞,5], (*∞52)
Dual	Order-5 apeirogonal tiling
Properties	Vertex-transitive, edge-transitive, face-transitive

In 2-dimensional hyperbolic geometry, the infinite-order pentagonal tiling is a regular tiling. It has Schläfli symbol of {5,∞}. All vertices are ideal, located at "infinity", seen on the boundary of the Poincaré hyperbolic disk projection.

== Symmetry ==
There is a half symmetry form,, seen with alternating colors:

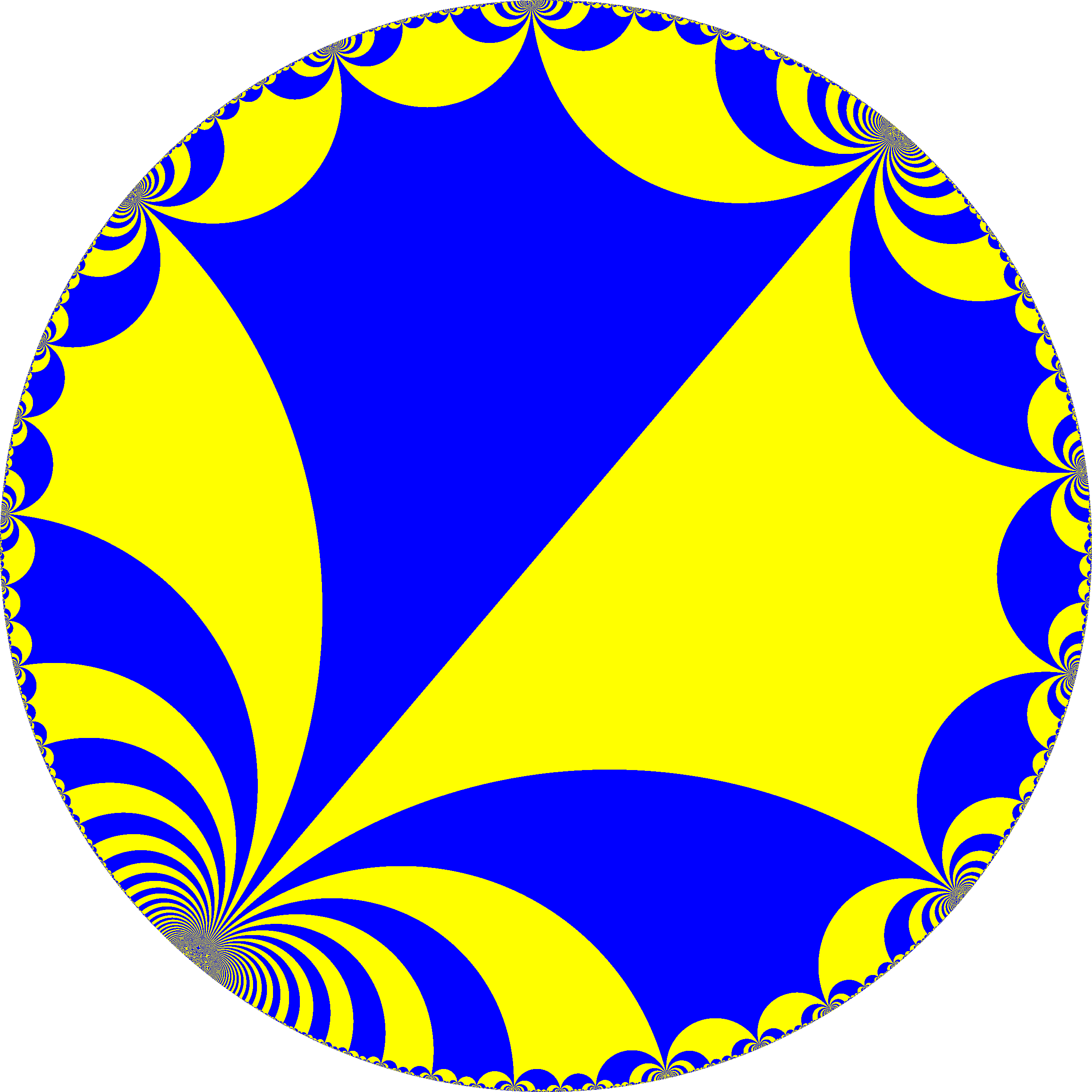

== Related polyhedra and tiling ==
This tiling is topologically related as a part of sequence of regular polyhedra and tilings with vertex figure (5^{n}).

Finite	Compact hyperbolic					Paracompact
{5,3}	{5,4}	{5,5}	{5,6}	{5,7}	{5,8}...	{5,∞}

Paracompact uniform apeirogonal/pentagonal tilings
Symmetry: [∞,5], (*∞52)							[∞,5]^{+} (∞52)	[1^{+},∞,5] (*∞55)		[∞,5^{+}] (5*∞)
{∞,5}	t{∞,5}	r{∞,5}	2t{∞,5}=t{5,∞}	2r{∞,5}={5,∞}	rr{∞,5}	tr{∞,5}	sr{∞,5}	h{∞,5}	h_{2}{∞,5}	s{5,∞}
Uniform duals
V∞^{5}	V5.∞.∞	V5.∞.5.∞	V∞.10.10	V5^{∞}	V4.5.4.∞	V4.10.∞	V3.3.5.3.∞		V(∞.5)^{5}	V3.5.3.5.3.∞

== See also ==
- Pentagonal tiling
- Uniform tilings in hyperbolic plane
- List of regular polytopes
