= Truncated order-7 square tiling =

Uniform tiling of the hyperbolic plane

Truncated order-7 square tiling
Poincaré disk model of the hyperbolic plane
Type	Hyperbolic uniform tiling
Vertex configuration	8.8.7
Schläfli symbol	t{4,7}
Wythoff symbol	2 7 | 4
Coxeter diagram	
Symmetry group	[7,4], (*742)
Dual	Order-4 heptakis heptagonal tiling
Properties	Vertex-transitive

In geometry, the truncated order-7 square tiling is a uniform tiling of the hyperbolic plane. It has Schläfli symbol of t_{0,1}{4,7}.

== Related polyhedra and tiling ==
*n42 symmetry mutation of truncated tilings: n.8.8
Symmetry *n42 [n,4]	Spherical		Euclidean	Compact hyperbolic				Paracompact
Symmetry *n42 [n,4]	*242 [2,4]	*342 [3,4]	*442 [4,4]	*542 [5,4]	*642 [6,4]	*742 [7,4]	*842 [8,4]...	*∞42 [∞,4]
Truncated figures								
Config.	2.8.8	3.8.8	4.8.8	5.8.8	6.8.8	7.8.8	8.8.8	∞.8.8
n-kis figures								
Config.	V2.8.8	V3.8.8	V4.8.8	V5.8.8	V6.8.8	V7.8.8	V8.8.8	V∞.8.8

Uniform heptagonal/square tilings
Symmetry: [7,4], (*742)							[7,4]^{+}, (742)	[7^{+},4], (7*2)	[7,4,1^{+}], (*772)
{7,4}	t{7,4}	r{7,4}	2t{7,4}=t{4,7}	2r{7,4}={4,7}	rr{7,4}	tr{7,4}	sr{7,4}	s{7,4}	h{4,7}
Uniform duals
V7^{4}	V4.14.14	V4.7.4.7	V7.8.8	V4^{7}	V4.4.7.4	V4.8.14	V3.3.4.3.7	V3.3.7.3.7	V7^{7}

== See also ==
- Uniform tilings in hyperbolic plane
- List of regular polytopes
