= Truncated order-4 apeirogonal tiling =

Geometry term

Truncated order-4 apeirogonal tiling
Poincaré disk model of the hyperbolic plane
Type	Hyperbolic uniform tiling
Vertex configuration	4.∞.∞
Schläfli symbol	t{∞,4} tr{∞,∞} or $t\begin{Bmatrix} \infin \\ \infin \end{Bmatrix}$
Wythoff symbol	2 4 | ∞ 2 ∞ ∞ |
Coxeter diagram	or
Symmetry group	[∞,4], (*∞42) [∞,∞], (*∞∞2)
Dual	Infinite-order tetrakis square tiling
Properties	Vertex-transitive

In geometry, the truncated order-4 apeirogonal tiling is a uniform tiling of the hyperbolic plane. It has Schläfli symbol of t{∞,4}.

== Uniform colorings ==
A half symmetry coloring is tr{∞,∞}, has two types of apeirogons, shown red and yellow here. If the apeirogonal curvature is too large, it doesn't converge to a single ideal point, like the right image, red apeirogons below. Coxeter diagram are shown with dotted lines for these divergent, ultraparallel mirrors.

(Vertex centered)	(Square centered)

== Symmetry ==
From [∞,∞] symmetry, there are 15 small index subgroup by mirror removal and alternation. Mirrors can be removed if its branch orders are all even, and cuts neighboring branch orders in half. Removing two mirrors leaves a half-order gyration point where the removed mirrors met. In these images fundamental domains are alternately colored black and white, and mirrors exist on the boundaries between colors. The symmetry can be doubled as ∞42 symmetry by adding a mirror bisecting the fundamental domain. The subgroup index-8 group, [1^{+},∞,1^{+},∞,1^{+}] (∞∞∞∞) is the commutator subgroup of [∞,∞].

Small index subgroups of [∞,∞] (*∞∞2)
Index	1	2			4	
Diagram						
Coxeter	[∞,∞] =	[1^{+},∞,∞] =	[∞,∞,1^{+}] =	[∞,1^{+},∞] =	[1^{+},∞,∞,1^{+}] =	[∞^{+},∞^{+}]
Orbifold	*∞∞2	*∞∞∞		*∞2∞2	*∞∞∞∞	∞∞×
Semidirect subgroups
Diagram						
Coxeter		[∞,∞^{+}]	[∞^{+},∞]	[(∞,∞,2^{+})]	[∞,1^{+},∞,1^{+}] = = = =	[1^{+},∞,1^{+},∞] = = = =
Orbifold		∞*∞		2*∞∞	∞*∞∞	
Direct subgroups
Index	2	4			8	
Diagram						
Coxeter	[∞,∞]^{+} =	[∞,∞^{+}]^{+} =	[∞^{+},∞]^{+} =	[∞,1^{+},∞]^{+} =	[∞^{+},∞^{+}]^{+} = [1^{+},∞,1^{+},∞,1^{+}] = = =	
Orbifold	∞∞2	∞∞∞		∞2∞2	∞∞∞∞	
Radical subgroups
Index		∞		∞		
Diagram						
Coxeter		[∞,∞*]	[∞*,∞]	[∞,∞*]^{+}	[∞*,∞]^{+}	
Orbifold		*∞^{∞}		∞^{∞}		

== Related polyhedra and tiling ==
*n42 symmetry mutation of truncated tilings: 4.2n.2n
Symmetry *n42 [n,4]	Spherical		Euclidean	Compact hyperbolic				Paracomp.
Symmetry *n42 [n,4]	*242 [2,4]	*342 [3,4]	*442 [4,4]	*542 [5,4]	*642 [6,4]	*742 [7,4]	*842 [8,4]...	*∞42 [∞,4]
Truncated figures								
Config.	4.4.4	4.6.6	4.8.8	4.10.10	4.12.12	4.14.14	4.16.16	4.∞.∞
n-kis figures								
Config.	V4.4.4	V4.6.6	V4.8.8	V4.10.10	V4.12.12	V4.14.14	V4.16.16	V4.∞.∞

Paracompact uniform tilings in [∞,4] family
{∞,4}	t{∞,4}	r{∞,4}	2t{∞,4}=t{4,∞}	2r{∞,4}={4,∞}	rr{∞,4}	tr{∞,4}
Dual figures
V∞^{4}	V4.∞.∞	V(4.∞)^{2}	V8.8.∞	V4^{∞}	V4^{3}.∞	V4.8.∞
Alternations
[1^{+},∞,4] (*44∞)	[∞^{+},4] (∞*2)	[∞,1^{+},4] (*2∞2∞)	[∞,4^{+}] (4*∞)	[∞,4,1^{+}] (*∞∞2)	[(∞,4,2^{+})] (2*2∞)	[∞,4]^{+} (∞42)
=				=		
h{∞,4}	s{∞,4}	hr{∞,4}	s{4,∞}	h{4,∞}	hrr{∞,4}	s{∞,4}
Alternation duals
V(∞.4)^{4}	V3.(3.∞)^{2}	V(4.∞.4)^{2}	V3.∞.(3.4)^{2}	V∞^{∞}	V∞.4^{4}	V3.3.4.3.∞

Paracompact uniform tilings in [∞,∞] family
= =	= =	= =	= =	= =	=	=
{∞,∞}	t{∞,∞}	r{∞,∞}	2t{∞,∞}=t{∞,∞}	2r{∞,∞}={∞,∞}	rr{∞,∞}	tr{∞,∞}
Dual tilings
V∞^{∞}	V∞.∞.∞	V(∞.∞)^{2}	V∞.∞.∞	V∞^{∞}	V4.∞.4.∞	V4.4.∞
Alternations
[1^{+},∞,∞] (*∞∞2)	[∞^{+},∞] (∞*∞)	[∞,1^{+},∞] (*∞∞∞∞)	[∞,∞^{+}] (∞*∞)	[∞,∞,1^{+}] (*∞∞2)	[(∞,∞,2^{+})] (2*∞∞)	[∞,∞]^{+} (2∞∞)
h{∞,∞}	s{∞,∞}	hr{∞,∞}	s{∞,∞}	h_{2}{∞,∞}	hrr{∞,∞}	sr{∞,∞}
Alternation duals
V(∞.∞)^{∞}	V(3.∞)^{3}	V(∞.4)^{4}	V(3.∞)^{3}	V∞^{∞}	V(4.∞.4)^{2}	V3.3.∞.3.∞

== See also ==
- Uniform tilings in hyperbolic plane
- List of regular polytopes
