= Snub infinite-order triangular tiling =

Type of uniform tiling in geometry

Snub triapeirotrigonal tiling
Poincaré disk model of the hyperbolic plane
Type	Hyperbolic uniform tiling
Vertex configuration	3.3.3.3.3.∞
Schläfli symbol	s{3,∞} s(∞,3,3)
Wythoff symbol	| ∞ 3 3
Coxeter diagram	
Symmetry group	[(∞,3,3)]^{+}, (∞33)
Dual	Order-i-3-3_t0 dual tiling
Properties	Vertex-transitive Chiral

In geometry, the snub infinite-order triangular tiling is a uniform tiling of the hyperbolic plane with a Schläfli symbol of s{3,∞}.

== Related polyhedra and tiling ==
Paracompact hyperbolic uniform tilings in [(∞,3,3)] family
Symmetry: [(∞,3,3)], (*∞33)							[(∞,3,3)]^{+}, (∞33)
(∞,∞,3)	t_{0,1}(∞,3,3)	t_{1}(∞,3,3)	t_{1,2}(∞,3,3)	t_{2}(∞,3,3)	t_{0,2}(∞,3,3)	t_{0,1,2}(∞,3,3)	s(∞,3,3)
Dual tilings
V(3.∞)^{3}	V3.∞.3.∞	V(3.∞)^{3}	V3.6.∞.6	V(3.3)^{∞}	V3.6.∞.6	V6.6.∞	V3.3.3.3.3.∞

== See also ==
- Square tiling
- Uniform tilings in hyperbolic plane
- List of regular polytopes
