= Order-4 heptagonal tiling =

Regular tiling of the hyperbolic plane

Order-4 heptagonal tiling
Poincaré disk model of the hyperbolic plane
Type	Hyperbolic regular tiling
Vertex configuration	7^{4}
Schläfli symbol	{7,4} r{7,7}
Wythoff symbol	4 | 7 2; 2 | 7 7
Coxeter diagram	
Symmetry group	[7,4], (*742) [7,7], (*772)
Dual	Order-7 square tiling
Properties	Vertex-transitive, edge-transitive, face-transitive

In geometry, the order-4 heptagonal tiling is a regular tiling of the hyperbolic plane. It has Schläfli symbol of {7,4}.

== Symmetry ==
This tiling represents a hyperbolic kaleidoscope of 7 mirrors meeting as edges of a regular heptagon. This symmetry by orbifold notation is called *2222222 with 7 order-2 mirror intersections. In Coxeter notation can be represented as [1^{+},7,1^{+},4], removing two of three mirrors (passing through the heptagon center) in the [7,4] symmetry.

The kaleidoscopic domains can be seen as bicolored heptagons, representing mirror images of the fundamental domain. This coloring represents the uniform tiling t_{1}{7,7} and as a quasiregular tiling is called a heptaheptagonal tiling.

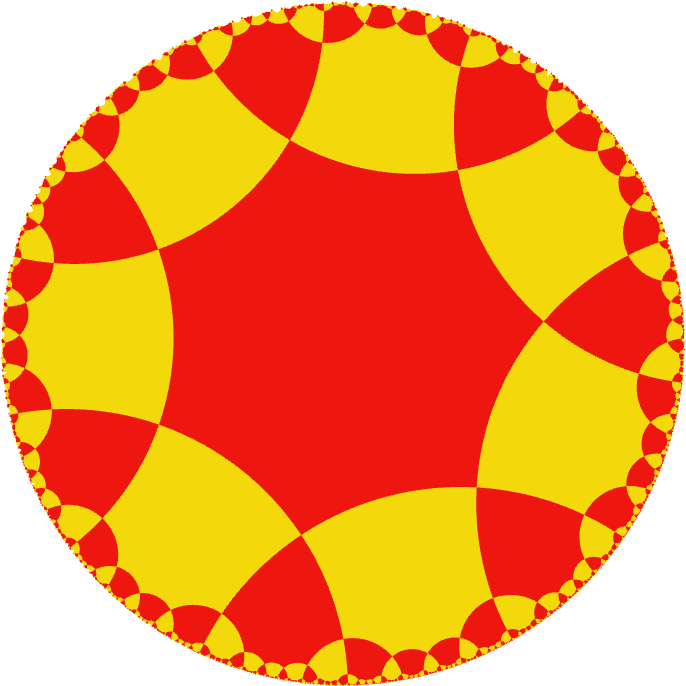

== Related polyhedra and tiling ==
Uniform heptagonal/square tilings
Symmetry: [7,4], (*742)							[7,4]^{+}, (742)	[7^{+},4], (7*2)	[7,4,1^{+}], (*772)
{7,4}	t{7,4}	r{7,4}	2t{7,4}=t{4,7}	2r{7,4}={4,7}	rr{7,4}	tr{7,4}	sr{7,4}	s{7,4}	h{4,7}
Uniform duals
V7^{4}	V4.14.14	V4.7.4.7	V7.8.8	V4^{7}	V4.4.7.4	V4.8.14	V3.3.4.3.7	V3.3.7.3.7	V7^{7}

Uniform heptaheptagonal tilings
Symmetry: [7,7], (*772)							[7,7]^{+}, (772)
= =	= =	= =	= =	= =	= =	= =	= =
{7,7}	t{7,7}	r{7,7}	2t{7,7}=t{7,7}	2r{7,7}={7,7}	rr{7,7}	tr{7,7}	sr{7,7}
Uniform duals
V7^{7}	V7.14.14	V7.7.7.7	V7.14.14	V7^{7}	V4.7.4.7	V4.14.14	V3.3.7.3.7

This tiling is topologically related as a part of sequence of regular tilings with heptagonal faces, starting with the heptagonal tiling, with Schläfli symbol {6,n}, and Coxeter diagram, progressing to infinity.

{7,3}	{7,4}	{7,5}	{7,6}	{7,7}

This tiling is also topologically related as a part of sequence of regular polyhedra and tilings with four faces per vertex, starting with the octahedron, with Schläfli symbol {n,4}, and Coxeter diagram, with n progressing to infinity.

*n42 symmetry mutation of regular tilings: {n,4}
Spherical		Euclidean	Hyperbolic tilings				
2^{4}	3^{4}	4^{4}	5^{4}	6^{4}	7^{4}	8^{4}	...∞^{4}

== See also ==
- Square tiling
- Tilings of regular polygons
- List of uniform planar tilings
- List of regular polytopes
