= Snub apeiroapeirogonal tiling =

Type of uniform tiling in geometry

Snub apeiroapeirogonal tiling
Poincaré disk model of the hyperbolic plane
Type	Hyperbolic uniform tiling
Vertex configuration	3.3.∞.3.∞
Schläfli symbol	s{∞,4} sr{∞,∞} or $s\begin{Bmatrix} \infin \\ \infin \end{Bmatrix}$
Wythoff symbol	| ∞ ∞ 2
Coxeter diagram	or
Symmetry group	[∞,∞]^{+}, (∞∞2)
Dual	Infinitely-infinite-order floret pentagonal tiling
Properties	Vertex-transitive Chiral

In geometry, the snub apeiroapeirogonal tiling is a uniform tiling of the hyperbolic plane. It has Schläfli symbol of s{∞,∞}. It has 3 equilateral triangles and 2 apeirogons around every vertex, with vertex figure 3.3.∞.3.∞.

== Dual tiling ==
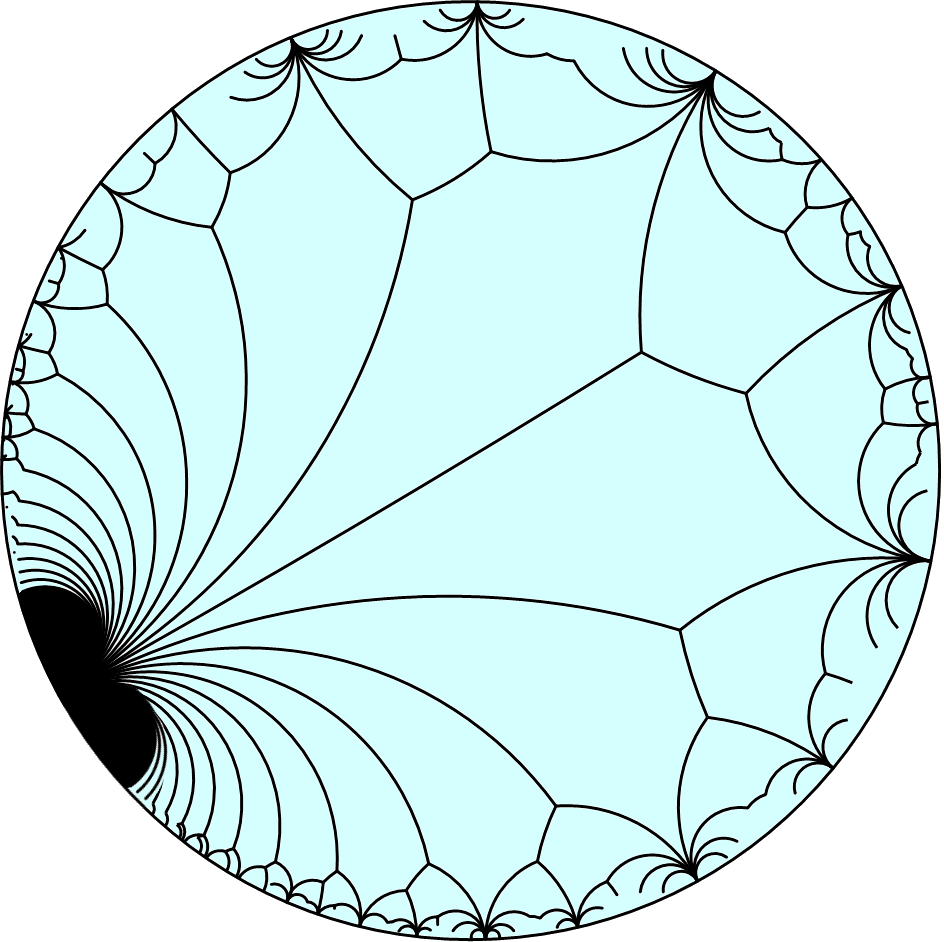

== Related polyhedra and tiling ==
Paracompact uniform tilings in [∞,∞] family
= =	= =	= =	= =	= =	=	=
{∞,∞}	t{∞,∞}	r{∞,∞}	2t{∞,∞}=t{∞,∞}	2r{∞,∞}={∞,∞}	rr{∞,∞}	tr{∞,∞}
Dual tilings
V∞^{∞}	V∞.∞.∞	V(∞.∞)^{2}	V∞.∞.∞	V∞^{∞}	V4.∞.4.∞	V4.4.∞
Alternations
[1^{+},∞,∞] (*∞∞2)	[∞^{+},∞] (∞*∞)	[∞,1^{+},∞] (*∞∞∞∞)	[∞,∞^{+}] (∞*∞)	[∞,∞,1^{+}] (*∞∞2)	[(∞,∞,2^{+})] (2*∞∞)	[∞,∞]^{+} (2∞∞)
h{∞,∞}	s{∞,∞}	hr{∞,∞}	s{∞,∞}	h_{2}{∞,∞}	hrr{∞,∞}	sr{∞,∞}
Alternation duals
V(∞.∞)^{∞}	V(3.∞)^{3}	V(∞.4)^{4}	V(3.∞)^{3}	V∞^{∞}	V(4.∞.4)^{2}	V3.3.∞.3.∞

The snub tetrapeirogonal tiling is last in an infinite series of snub polyhedra and tilings with vertex figure 3.3.n.3.n.

4n2 symmetry mutations of snub tilings: 3.3.n.3.n
Symmetry 4n2	Spherical		Euclidean	Compact hyperbolic				Paracompact
Symmetry 4n2	222	322	442	552	662	772	882	∞∞2
Snub figures								
Config.	3.3.2.3.2	3.3.3.3.3	3.3.4.3.4	3.3.5.3.5	3.3.6.3.6	3.3.7.3.7	3.3.8.3.8	3.3.∞.3.∞
Gyro figures								
Config.	V3.3.2.3.2	V3.3.3.3.3	V3.3.4.3.4	V3.3.5.3.5	V3.3.6.3.6	V3.3.7.3.7	V3.3.8.3.8	V3.3.∞.3.∞

== See also ==
- Tilings of regular polygons
- List of uniform planar tilings
- List of regular polytopes
