= Hexaoctagonal tiling =

Geometry term

hexaoctagonal tiling
Poincaré disk model of the hyperbolic plane
Type	Hyperbolic uniform tiling
Vertex configuration	(6.8)^{2}
Schläfli symbol	r{8,6} or $\begin{Bmatrix} 8 \\ 6 \end{Bmatrix}$
Wythoff symbol	2 | 8 6
Coxeter diagram	
Symmetry group	[8,6], (*862)
Dual	Order-8-6 quasiregular rhombic tiling
Properties	Vertex-transitive edge-transitive

In geometry, the hexaoctagonal tiling is a uniform tiling of the hyperbolic plane.

== Constructions ==
There are four uniform constructions of this tiling, three of them as constructed by mirror removal from the [8,6] kaleidoscope. Removing the mirror between the order 2 and 4 points, [8,6,1^{+}], gives [(8,8,3)], (*883). Removing the mirror between the order 2 and 8 points, [1^{+},8,6], gives [(4,6,6)], (*664). Removing two mirrors as [8,1^{+},6,1^{+}], leaves remaining mirrors (*4343).

Four uniform constructions of 6.8.6.8
Uniform Coloring				
Symmetry	[8,6] (*862)	[(8,3,8)] = [8,6,1^{+}] (*883)	[(6,4,6)] = [1^{+},8,6] (*664)	[1^{+},8,6,1^{+}] (*4343)
Symbol	r{8,6}	r{(8,3,8)}	r{(6,4,6)}	
Coxeter diagram		=	=	=

== Symmetry ==
The dual tiling has face configuration V6.8.6.8, and represents the fundamental domains of a quadrilateral kaleidoscope, orbifold (*4343), shown here. Adding a 2-fold gyration point at the center of each rhombi defines a (2*43) orbifold. These are subsymmetries of [8,6].

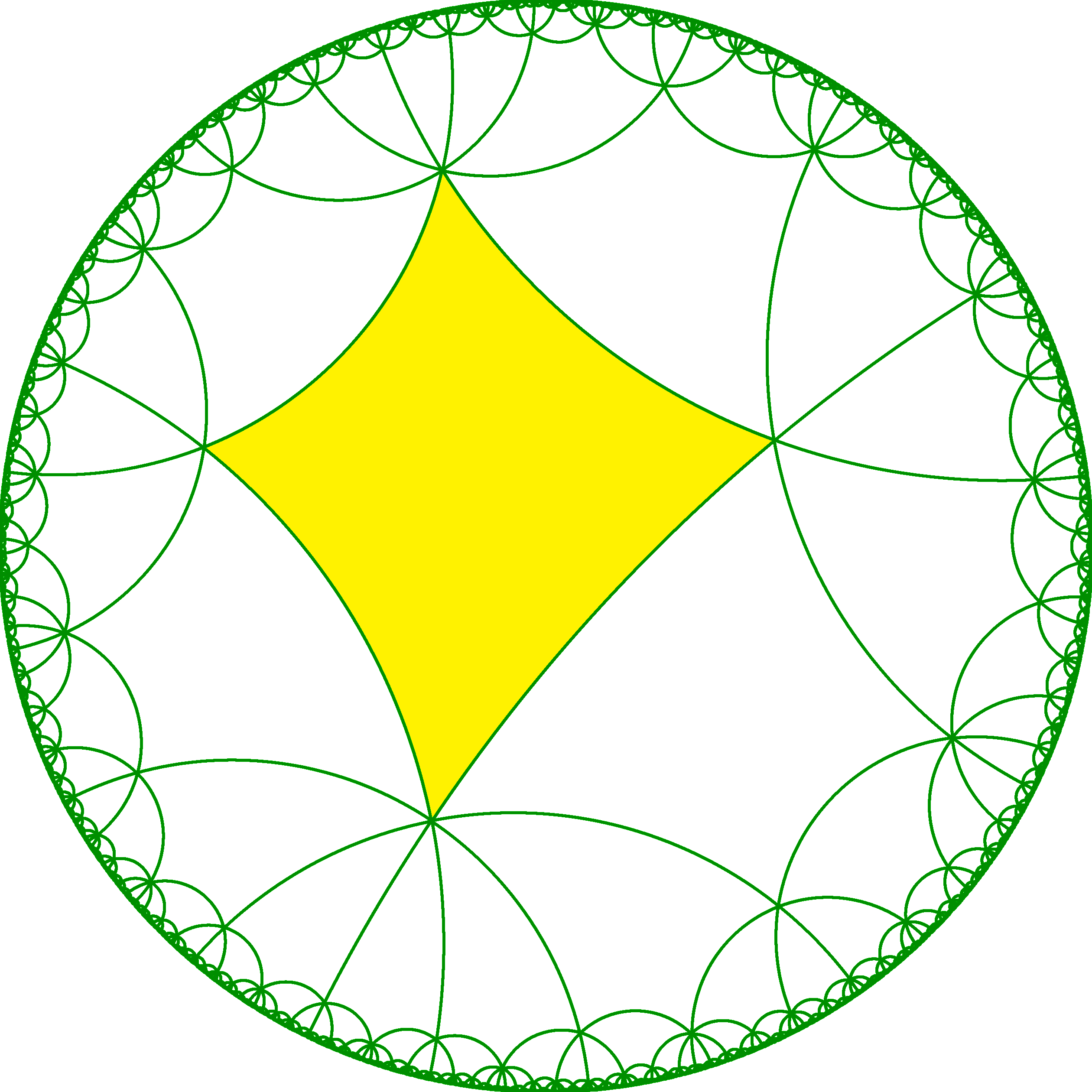
[1^{+},8,4,1^{+}], (*4343)

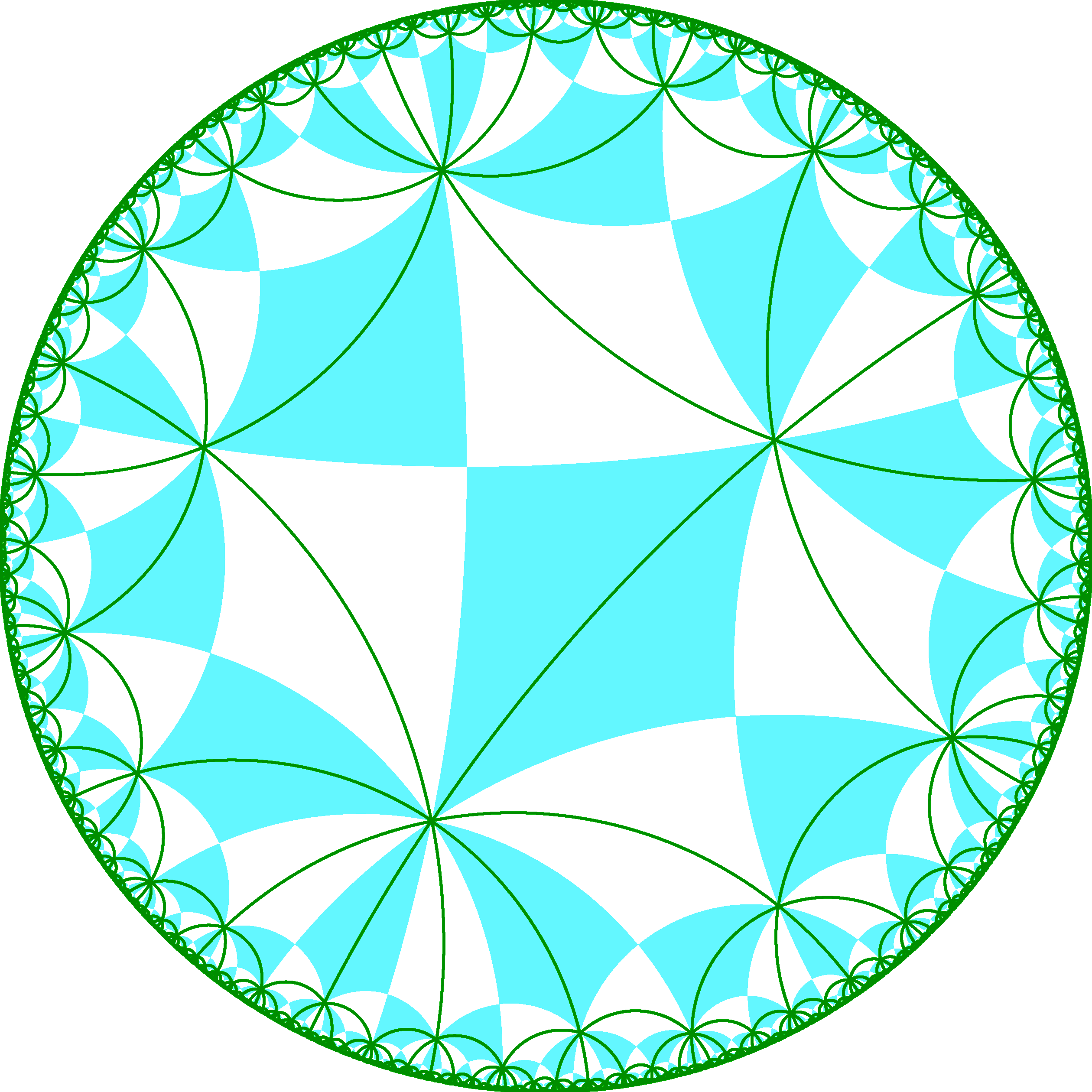
[(8,4,2^{+})], (2*43)

== Related polyhedra and tiling ==
Uniform octagonal/hexagonal tilings
Symmetry: [8,6], (*862)
{8,6}	t{8,6}	r{8,6}	2t{8,6}=t{6,8}	2r{8,6}={6,8}	rr{8,6}	tr{8,6}
Uniform duals
V8^{6}	V6.16.16	V(6.8)^{2}	V8.12.12	V6^{8}	V4.6.4.8	V4.12.16
Alternations
[1^{+},8,6] (*466)	[8^{+},6] (8*3)	[8,1^{+},6] (*4232)	[8,6^{+}] (6*4)	[8,6,1^{+}] (*883)	[(8,6,2^{+})] (2*43)	[8,6]^{+} (862)
h{8,6}	s{8,6}	hr{8,6}	s{6,8}	h{6,8}	hrr{8,6}	sr{8,6}
Alternation duals
V(4.6)^{6}	V3.3.8.3.8.3	V(3.4.4.4)^{2}	V3.4.3.4.3.6	V(3.8)^{8}	V3.4^{5}	V3.3.6.3.8

Symmetry mutation of quasiregular tilings: (6.n)^{2}
Symmetry *6n2 [n,6]	Euclidean	Compact hyperbolic					Paracompact	Noncompact
Symmetry *6n2 [n,6]	*632 [3,6]	*642 [4,6]	*652 [5,6]	*662 [6,6]	*762 [7,6]	*862 [8,6]...	*∞62 [∞,6]	[iπ/λ,6]
Quasiregular figures configuration	6.3.6.3	6.4.6.4	6.5.6.5	6.6.6.6	6.7.6.7	6.8.6.8	6.∞.6.∞	6.∞.6.∞
Dual figures
Rhombic figures configuration	V6.3.6.3	V6.4.6.4	V6.5.6.5	V6.6.6.6	V6.7.6.7	V6.8.6.8	V6.∞.6.∞	

Dimensional family of quasiregular polyhedra and tilings: (8.n)^{2}
Symmetry *8n2 [n,8]	Hyperbolic...						Paracompact	Noncompact
Symmetry *8n2 [n,8]	*832 [3,8]	*842 [4,8]	*852 [5,8]	*862 [6,8]	*872 [7,8]	*882 [8,8]...	*∞82 [∞,8]	[iπ/λ,8]
Coxeter								
Quasiregular figures configuration	3.8.3.8	4.8.4.8	8.5.8.5	8.6.8.6	8.7.8.7	8.8.8.8	8.∞.8.∞	8.∞.8.∞

== See also ==
- Square tiling
- Tilings of regular polygons
- List of uniform planar tilings
- List of regular polytopes
