= Snub hexaoctagonal tiling =

Type of uniform tiling in geometry

Snub hexaoctagonal tiling
Poincaré disk model of the hyperbolic plane
Type	Hyperbolic uniform tiling
Vertex configuration	3.3.6.3.8
Schläfli symbol	sr{8,6} or $s\begin{Bmatrix} 8 \\ 6 \end{Bmatrix}$
Wythoff symbol	| 8 6 2
Coxeter diagram	or
Symmetry group	[8,6]^{+}, (862)
Dual	Order-8-6 floret pentagonal tiling
Properties	Vertex-transitive Chiral

In geometry, the snub hexaoctagonal tiling is a semiregular tiling of the hyperbolic plane. There are three triangles, one hexagon, and one octagon on each vertex. It has Schläfli symbol of sr{8,6}.

== Images ==
Drawn in chiral pairs, with edges missing between black triangles:

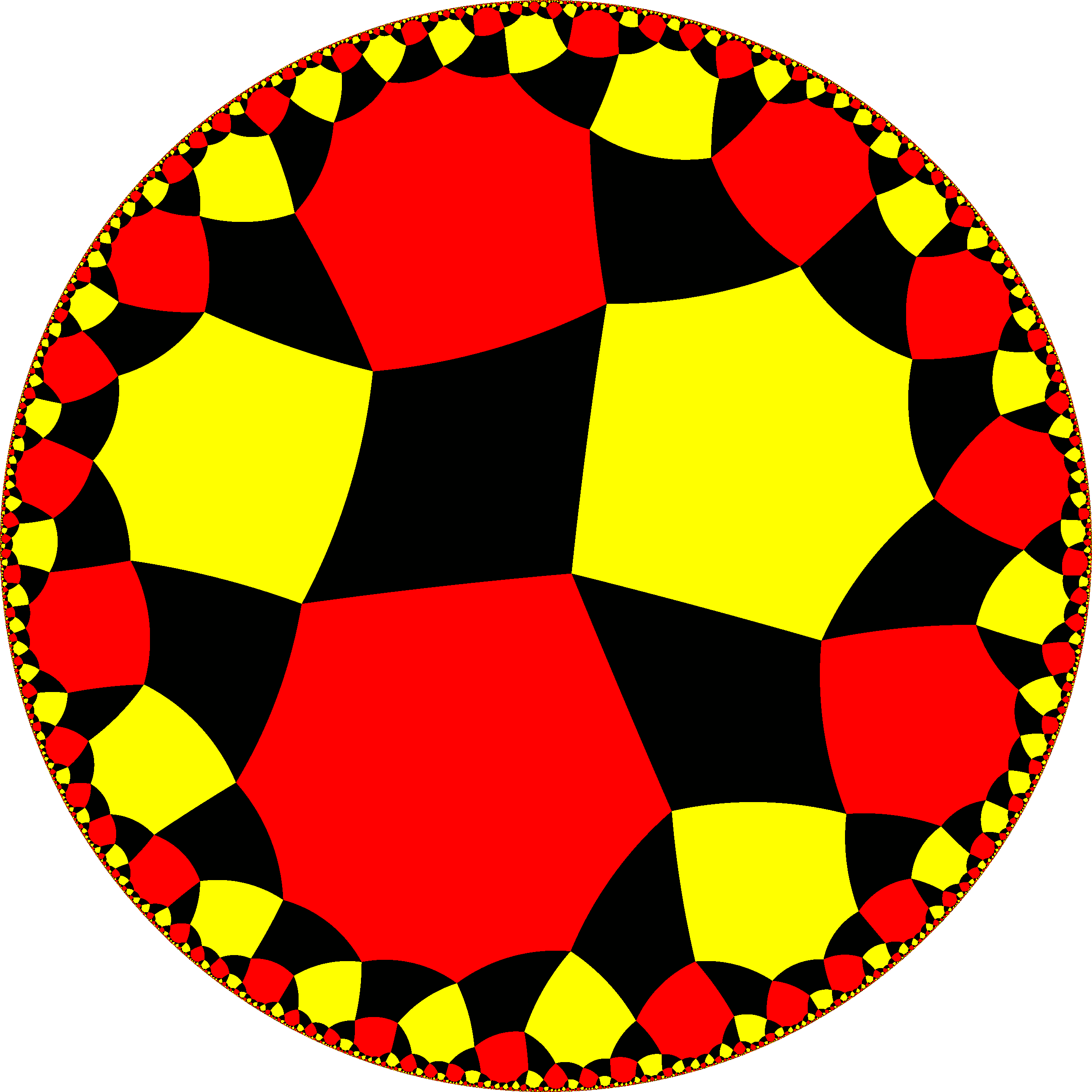
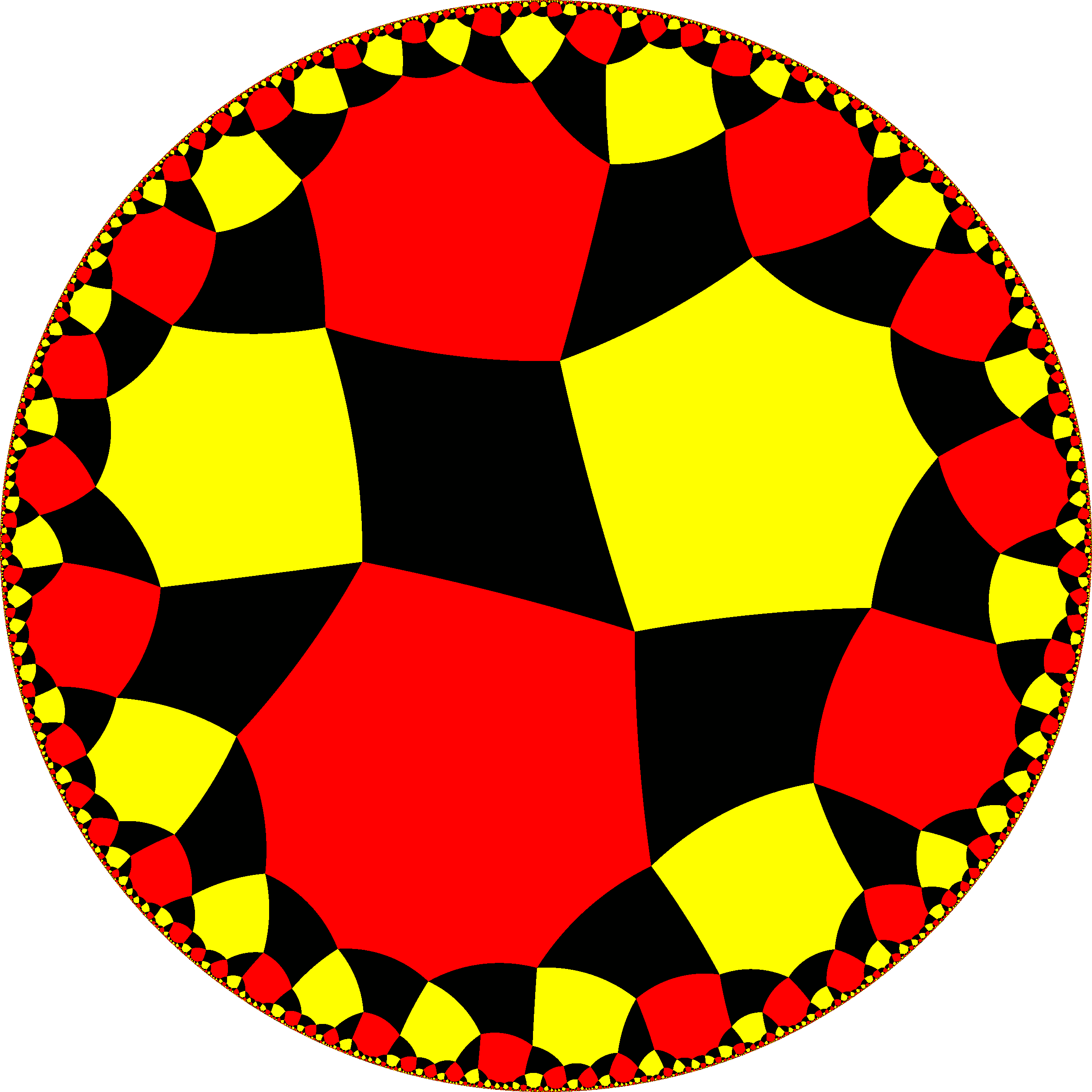

== Related polyhedra and tilings ==
From a Wythoff construction there are fourteen hyperbolic uniform tilings that can be based from the regular order-6 octagonal tiling.

Drawing the tiles colored as red on the original faces, yellow at the original vertices, and blue along the original edges, there are 7 forms with full [8,6] symmetry, and 7 with subsymmetry.

Uniform octagonal/hexagonal tilings
Symmetry: [8,6], (*862)
{8,6}	t{8,6}	r{8,6}	2t{8,6}=t{6,8}	2r{8,6}={6,8}	rr{8,6}	tr{8,6}
Uniform duals
V8^{6}	V6.16.16	V(6.8)^{2}	V8.12.12	V6^{8}	V4.6.4.8	V4.12.16
Alternations
[1^{+},8,6] (*466)	[8^{+},6] (8*3)	[8,1^{+},6] (*4232)	[8,6^{+}] (6*4)	[8,6,1^{+}] (*883)	[(8,6,2^{+})] (2*43)	[8,6]^{+} (862)
h{8,6}	s{8,6}	hr{8,6}	s{6,8}	h{6,8}	hrr{8,6}	sr{8,6}
Alternation duals
V(4.6)^{6}	V3.3.8.3.8.3	V(3.4.4.4)^{2}	V3.4.3.4.3.6	V(3.8)^{8}	V3.4^{5}	V3.3.6.3.8

== See also ==
- Tilings of regular polygons
- List of uniform planar tilings
