= Truncated order-8 hexagonal tiling =

Semiregular tiling of the hyperbolic plane

Truncated order-8 hexagonal tiling
Poincaré disk model of the hyperbolic plane
Type	Hyperbolic uniform tiling
Vertex configuration	8.12.12
Schläfli symbol	t{6,8}
Wythoff symbol	2 8 | 6
Coxeter diagram	
Symmetry group	[8,6], (*862)
Dual	Order-6 octakis octagonal tiling
Properties	Vertex-transitive

In geometry, the truncated order-8 hexagonal tiling is a semiregular tiling of the hyperbolic plane. It has Schläfli symbol of t{6,8}.

== Uniform colorings ==
This tiling can also be constructed from *664 symmetry, as t{(6,6,4)}.

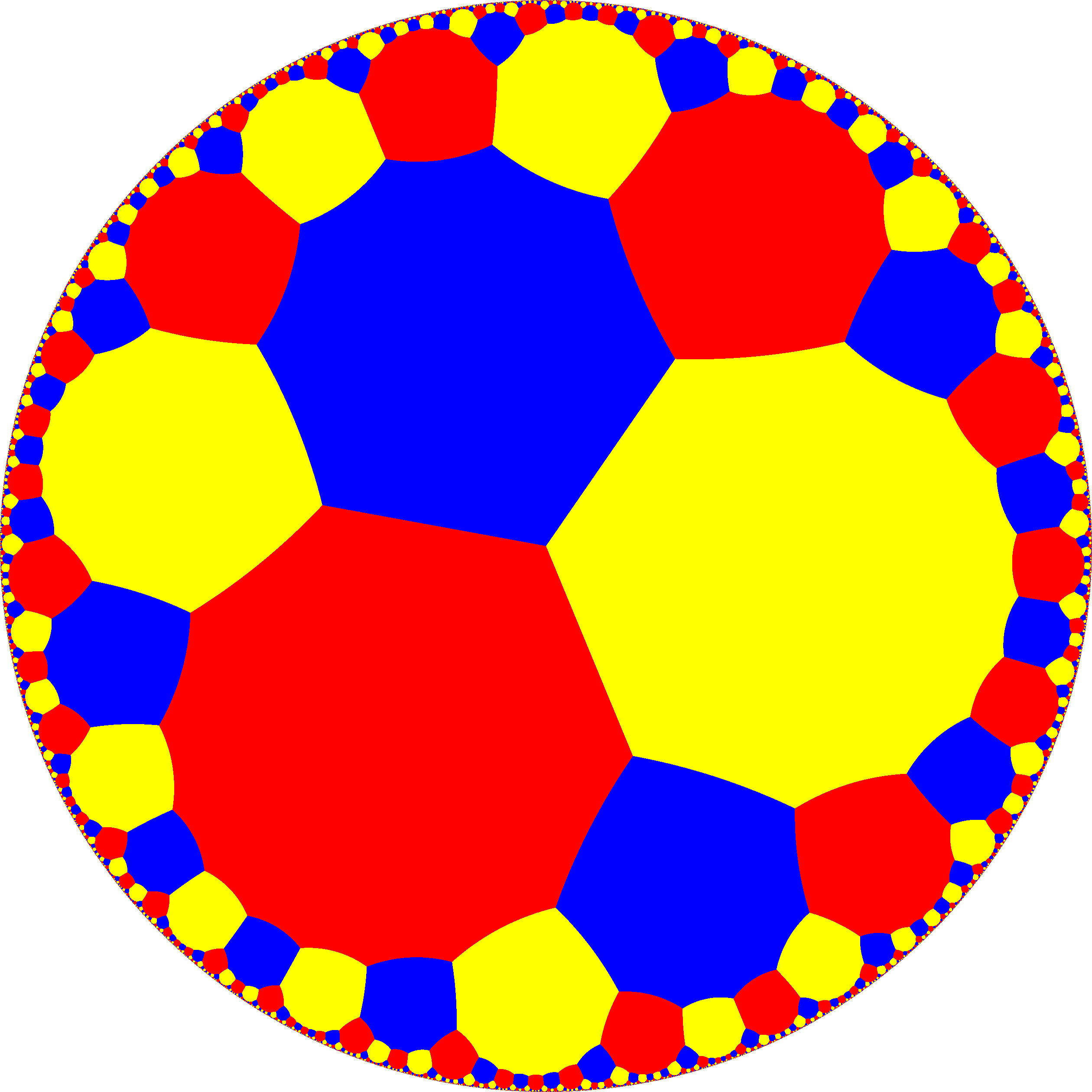

== Related polyhedra and tilings ==
From a Wythoff construction there are fourteen hyperbolic uniform tilings that can be based from the regular order-6 octagonal tiling.

Drawing the tiles colored as red on the original faces, yellow at the original vertices, and blue along the original edges, there are 7 forms with full [8,6] symmetry, and 7 with subsymmetry.

Uniform octagonal/hexagonal tilings
Symmetry: [8,6], (*862)
{8,6}	t{8,6}	r{8,6}	2t{8,6}=t{6,8}	2r{8,6}={6,8}	rr{8,6}	tr{8,6}
Uniform duals
V8^{6}	V6.16.16	V(6.8)^{2}	V8.12.12	V6^{8}	V4.6.4.8	V4.12.16
Alternations
[1^{+},8,6] (*466)	[8^{+},6] (8*3)	[8,1^{+},6] (*4232)	[8,6^{+}] (6*4)	[8,6,1^{+}] (*883)	[(8,6,2^{+})] (2*43)	[8,6]^{+} (862)
h{8,6}	s{8,6}	hr{8,6}	s{6,8}	h{6,8}	hrr{8,6}	sr{8,6}
Alternation duals
V(4.6)^{6}	V3.3.8.3.8.3	V(3.4.4.4)^{2}	V3.4.3.4.3.6	V(3.8)^{8}	V3.4^{5}	V3.3.6.3.8

=== Symmetry ===
The dual of the tiling represents the fundamental domains of (*664) orbifold symmetry. From [(6,6,4)] (*664) symmetry, there are 15 small index subgroup (11 unique) by mirror removal and alternation operators. Mirrors can be removed if its branch orders are all even, and cuts neighboring branch orders in half. Removing two mirrors leaves a half-order gyration point where the removed mirrors met. In these images fundamental domains are alternately colored black and white, and mirrors exist on the boundaries between colors. The symmetry can be doubled to 862 symmetry by adding a bisecting mirror across the fundamental domains. The subgroup index-8 group, [(1^{+},6,1^{+},6,1^{+},4)] (332332) is the commutator subgroup of [(6,6,4)].

A large subgroup is constructed [(6,6,4^{*})], index 8, as (4*33) with gyration points removed, becomes (*3^{8}), and another large subgroup is constructed [(6,6^{*},4)], index 12, as (6*32) with gyration points removed, becomes (*(32)^{6}).

Small index subgroups of [(6,6,4)] (*664)
Fundamental domains						
Subgroup index	1	2			4	
Coxeter	[(6,6,4)]	[(1^{+},6,6,4)]	[(6,6,1^{+},4)]	[(6,1^{+},6,4)]	[(1^{+},6,6,1^{+},4)]	[(6^{+},6^{+},4)]
Orbifold	*664	*6362		*4343	2*3333	332×
Coxeter		[(6,6^{+},4)]	[(6^{+},6,4)]	[(6,6,4^{+})]	[(6,1^{+},6,1^{+},4)]	[(1^{+},6,1^{+},6,4)]
Orbifold		6*32		4*33	3*3232	
Direct subgroups
Subgroup index	2	4			8	
Coxeter	[(6,6,4)]^{+}	[(1^{+},6,6^{+},4)]	[(6^{+},6,1^{+},4)]	[(6,1^{+},6,4^{+})]	[(6^{+},6^{+},4^{+})] = [(1^{+},6,1^{+},6,1^{+},4)] =	
Orbifold	664	6362		4343	332332	

== See also ==
- Tilings of regular polygons
- List of uniform planar tilings
