= Truncated order-6 octagonal tiling =

Hyperbolic tiling with truncated octagons.

Truncated order-6 octagonal tiling
Poincaré disk model of the hyperbolic plane
| Type | Hyperbolic uniform tiling |
| Vertex configuration | 6.16.16 |
| Schläfli symbol | t{8,6} |
| Wythoff symbol | 2 6 | 8 |
| Coxeter diagram | |
| Symmetry group | [8,6], (*862) |
| Dual | Order-8 hexakis hexagonal tiling |
| Properties | Vertex-transitive |

In geometry, the truncated order-6 octagonal tiling is a uniform tiling of the hyperbolic plane. It has Schläfli symbol of t{8,6}.

== Uniform colorings ==
A secondary construction t{(8,8,3)} is called a truncated trioctaoctagonal tiling:

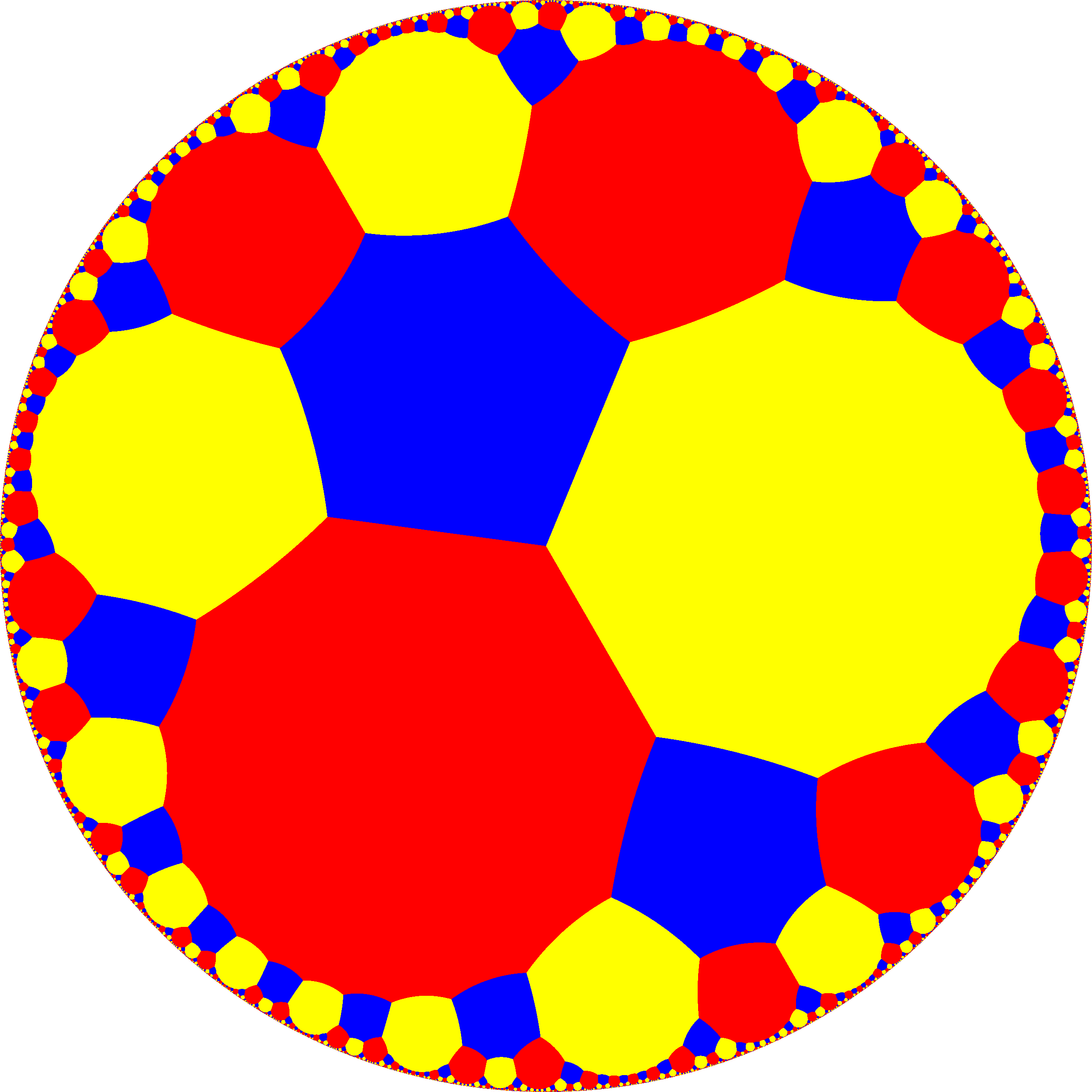

== Symmetry ==
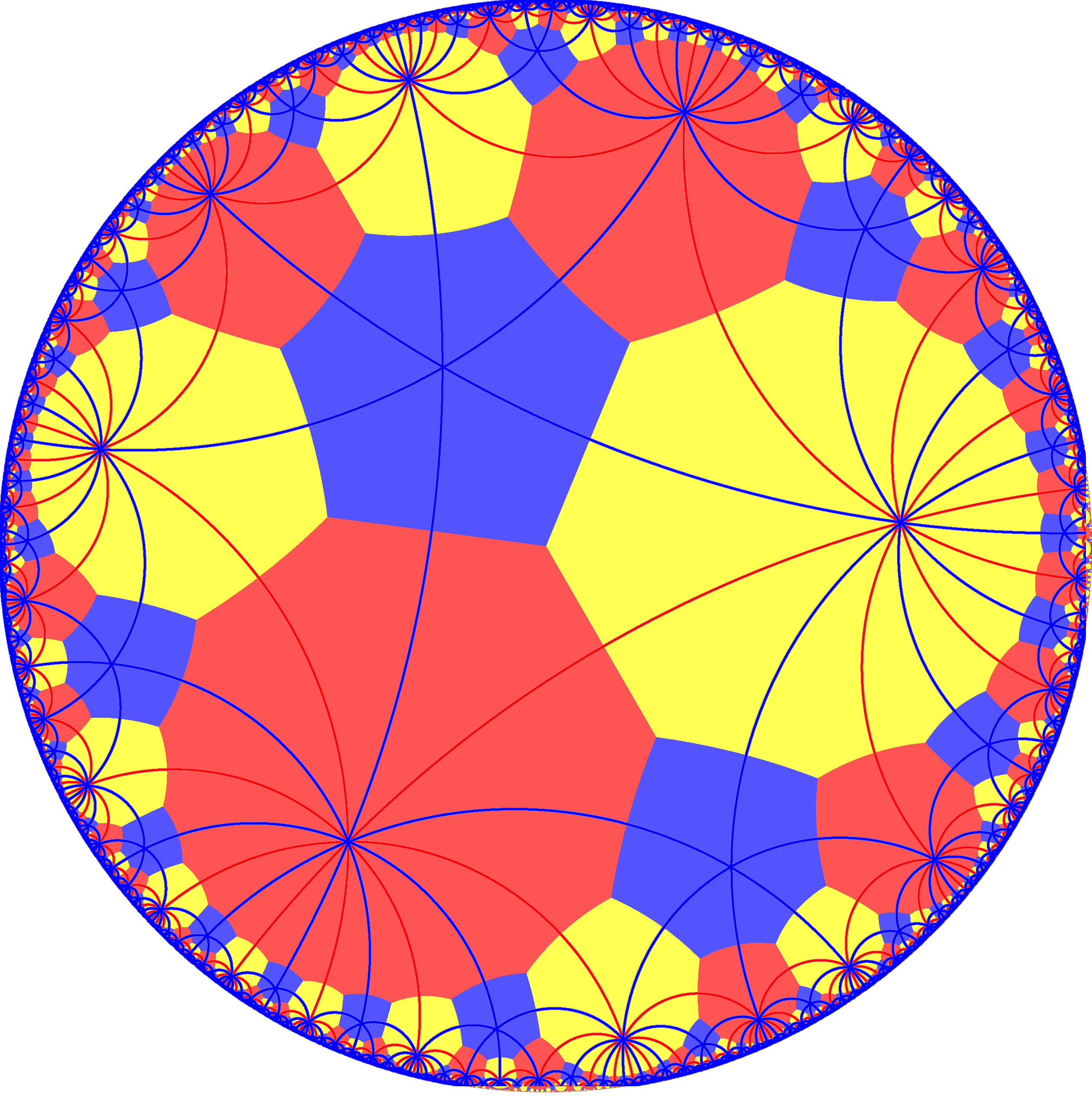
Truncated order-6 octagonal tiling with mirror lines,

The dual to this tiling represent the fundamental domains of [(8,8,3)] (*883) symmetry. There are 3 small index subgroup symmetries constructed from [(8,8,3)] by mirror removal and alternation. In these images fundamental domains are alternately colored black and white, and mirrors exist on the boundaries between colors.

The symmetry can be doubled as 862 symmetry by adding a mirror bisecting the fundamental domain.

Small index subgroups of [(8,8,3)] (*883)
| Index | 1 | 2 | | 6 |
|---|---|---|---|---|
| Diagram | | | | |
| Coxeter (orbifold) | [(8,8,3)] = (*883) | [(8,1^{+},8,3)] = = (*4343) | [(8,8,3^{+})] = (3*44) | [(8,8,3*)] = (*444444) |
Direct subgroups
| Index | 2 | 4 | | 12 |
| Diagram | | | | |
| Coxeter (orbifold) | [(8,8,3)]^{+} = (883) | [(8,8,3^{+})]^{+} = = (4343) | | [(8,8,3*)]^{+} = (444444) |

== Related polyhedra and tiling ==
Uniform octagonal/hexagonal tilings
Symmetry: [8,6], (*862)
| {8,6} | t{8,6} | r{8,6} | 2t{8,6}=t{6,8} | 2r{8,6}={6,8} | rr{8,6} | tr{8,6} |
Uniform duals
| V8^{6} | V6.16.16 | V(6.8)^{2} | V8.12.12 | V6^{8} | V4.6.4.8 | V4.12.16 |
Alternations
| [1^{+},8,6] (*466) | [8^{+},6] (8*3) | [8,1^{+},6] (*4232) | [8,6^{+}] (6*4) | [8,6,1^{+}] (*883) | [(8,6,2^{+})] (2*43) | [8,6]^{+} (862) |
| h{8,6} | s{8,6} | hr{8,6} | s{6,8} | h{6,8} | hrr{8,6} | sr{8,6} |
Alternation duals
| V(4.6)^{6} | V3.3.8.3.8.3 | V(3.4.4.4)^{2} | V3.4.3.4.3.6 | V(3.8)^{8} | V3.4^{5} | V3.3.6.3.8 |

== See also ==
- Tilings of regular polygons
- List of uniform planar tilings
- List of regular polytopes
