= Order-6 pentagonal tiling =

Regular tiling of the hyperbolic plane

Order-6 pentagonal tiling
Poincaré disk model of the hyperbolic plane
| Type | Hyperbolic regular tiling |
| Vertex configuration | 5^{6} |
| Schläfli symbol | {5,6} |
| Wythoff symbol | 6 | 5 2 |
| Coxeter diagram | |
| Symmetry group | [6,5], (*652) |
| Dual | Order-5 hexagonal tiling |
| Properties | Vertex-transitive, edge-transitive, face-transitive |

In geometry, the order-6 pentagonal tiling is a regular tiling of the hyperbolic plane. It has Schläfli symbol of {5,6}.

== Uniform coloring ==
This regular tiling can also be constructed from [(5,5,3)] symmetry alternating two colors of pentagons, represented by t_{1}(5,5,3).

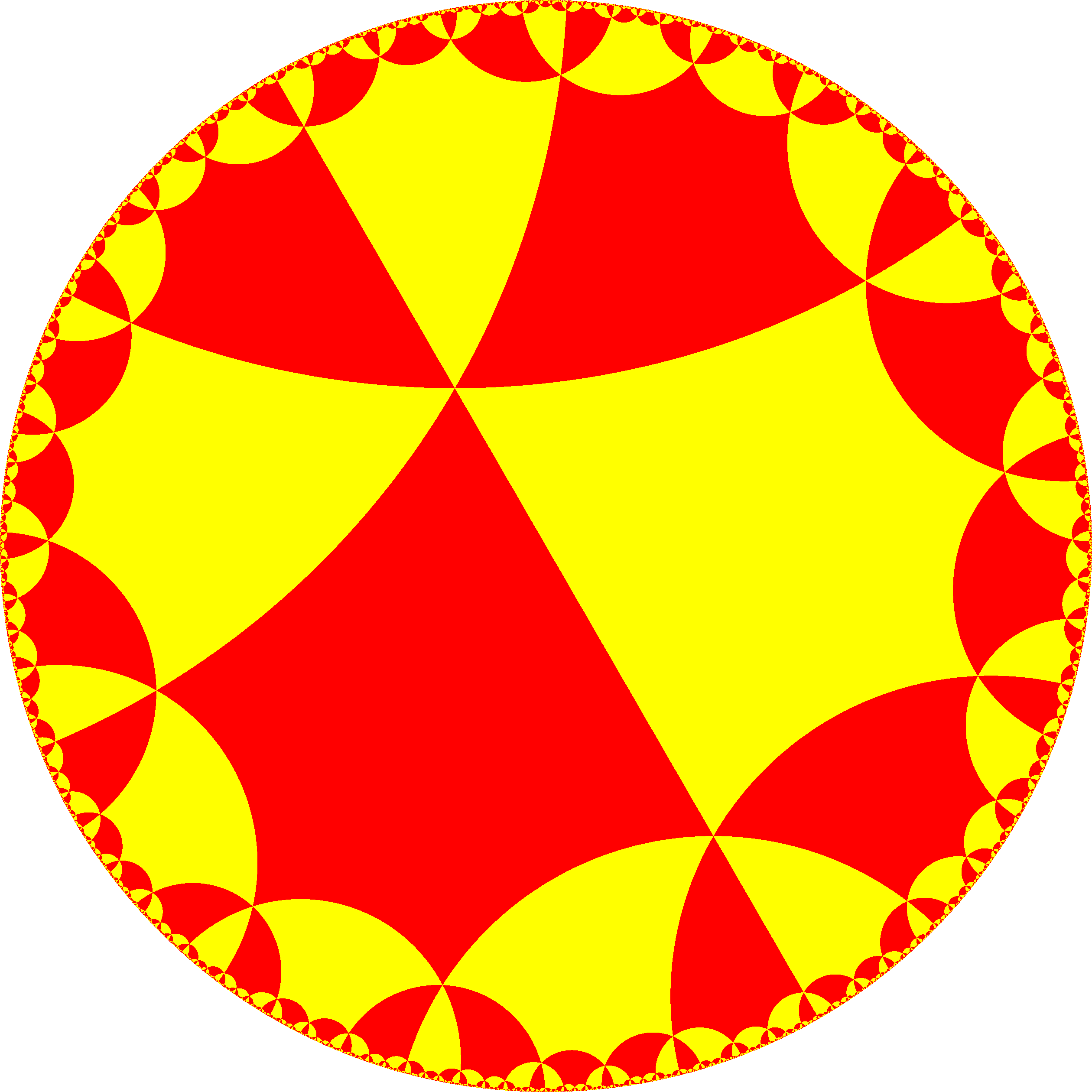

== Symmetry ==
This tiling represents a hyperbolic kaleidoscope of 6 mirrors defining a regular hexagon fundamental domain, and 5 mirrors meeting at a point. This symmetry by orbifold notation is called *33333 with 5 order-3 mirror intersections.

== Related polyhedra and tiling ==
This tiling is topologically related as a part of sequence of regular tilings with order-6 vertices with Schläfli symbol {n,6}, and Coxeter diagram, progressing to infinity.

Regular tilings {n,6}
| Spherical | Euclidean | Hyperbolic tilings | | | | | | |
|---|---|---|---|---|---|---|---|---|
| {2,6} | {3,6} | {4,6} | {5,6} | {6,6} | {7,6} | {8,6} | ... | {∞,6} |

Uniform hexagonal/pentagonal tilings
| Symmetry: [6,5], (*652) | | | | | | | [6,5]^{+}, (652) | [6,5^{+}], (5*3) | [1^{+},6,5], (*553) |
|---|---|---|---|---|---|---|---|---|---|
| {6,5} | t{6,5} | r{6,5} | 2t{6,5}=t{5,6} | 2r{6,5}={5,6} | rr{6,5} | tr{6,5} | sr{6,5} | s{5,6} | h{6,5} |
Uniform duals
| V6^{5} | V5.12.12 | V5.6.5.6 | V6.10.10 | V5^{6} | V4.5.4.6 | V4.10.12 | V3.3.5.3.6 | V3.3.3.5.3.5 | V(3.5)^{5} |

[(5,5,3)] reflective symmetry uniform tilings

== See also ==
- Square tiling
- Uniform tilings in hyperbolic plane
- List of regular polytopes
