= Truncated hexaoctagonal tiling =

Semi regularly Tiling

Truncated hexaoctagonal tiling
Poincaré disk model of the hyperbolic plane
Type	Hyperbolic uniform tiling
Vertex configuration	4.12.16
Schläfli symbol	tr{8,6} or $t\begin{Bmatrix} 8 \\ 6 \end{Bmatrix}$
Wythoff symbol	2 8 6 |
Coxeter diagram	or
Symmetry group	[8,6], (*862)
Dual	Order-6-8 kisrhombille tiling
Properties	Vertex-transitive

In geometry, the truncated hexaoctagonal tiling is a semiregular tiling of the hyperbolic plane. There are one square, one dodecagon, and one hexakaidecagon on each vertex. It has Schläfli symbol of tr{8,6}.

== Dual tiling ==
The dual tiling is called an order-6-8 kisrhombille tiling, made as a complete bisection of the order-6 octagonal tiling, here with triangles are shown with alternating colors. This tiling represents the fundamental triangular domains of [8,6] (*862) symmetry.

== Symmetry ==
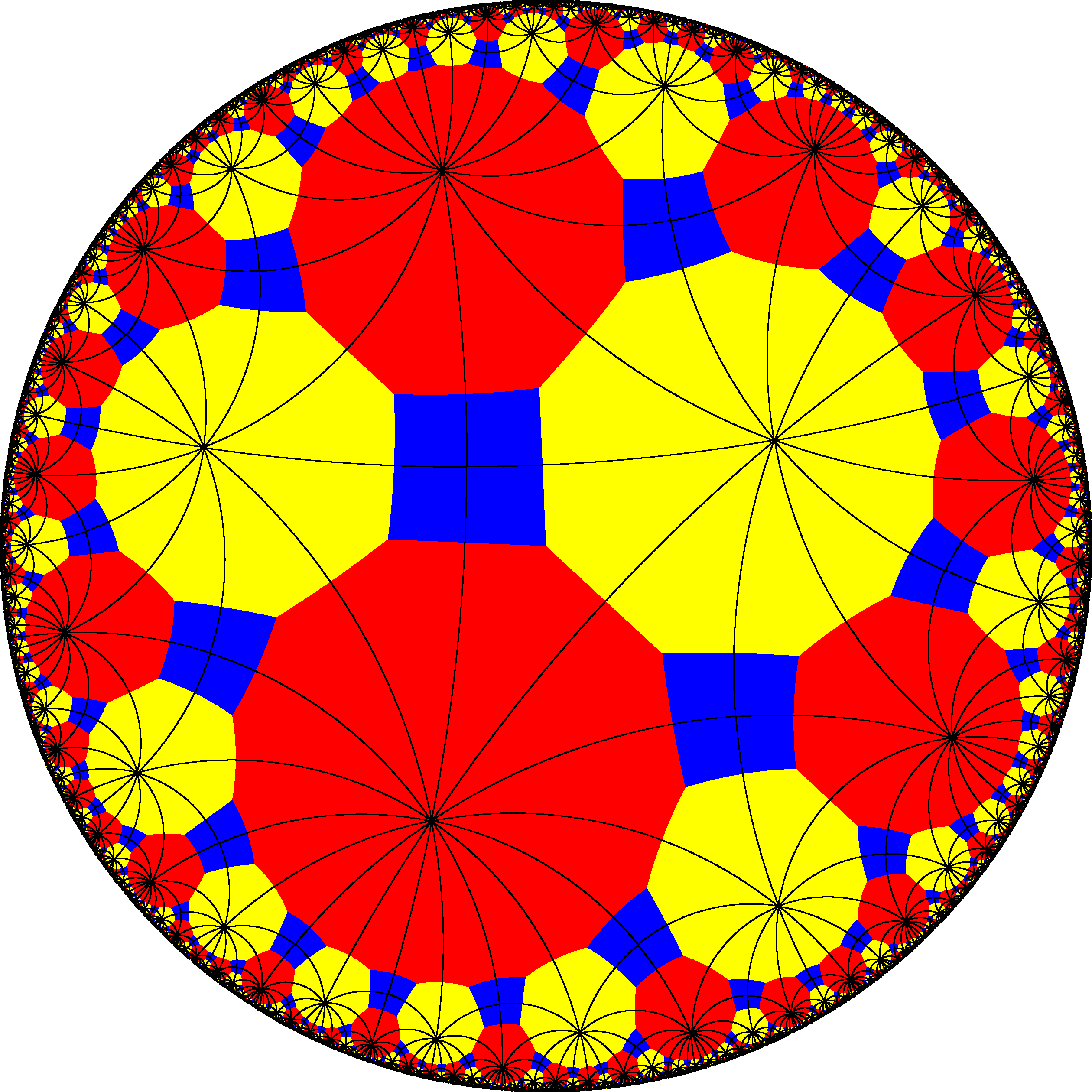
Truncated hexaoctagonal tiling with mirror lines

There are six reflective subgroup kaleidoscopic constructed from [8,6] by removing one or two of three mirrors. Mirrors can be removed if its branch orders are all even, and cuts neighboring branch orders in half. Removing two mirrors leaves a half-order gyration point where the removed mirrors met. In these images fundamental domains are alternately colored black and white, and mirrors exist on the boundaries between colors. The subgroup index-8 group, [1^{+},8,1^{+},6,1^{+}] (4343) is the commutator subgroup of [8,6].

A radical subgroup is constructed as [8,6*], index 12, as [8,6^{+}], (6*4) with gyration points removed, becomes (*444444), and another [8*,6], index 16 as [8^{+},6], (8*3) with gyration points removed as (*33333333).

Small index subgroups of [8,6] (*862)
Index	1	2			4	
Diagram						
Coxeter	[8,6] =	[1^{+},8,6] =	[8,6,1^{+}] = =	[8,1^{+},6] =	[1^{+},8,6,1^{+}] =	[8^{+},6^{+}]
Orbifold	*862	*664	*883	*4232	*4343	43×
Semidirect subgroups
Diagram						
Coxeter		[8,6^{+}]	[8^{+},6]	[(8,6,2^{+})]	[8,1^{+},6,1^{+}] = = = =	[1^{+},8,1^{+},6] = = = =
Orbifold		6*4	8*3	2*43	3*44	4*33
Direct subgroups
Index	2	4			8	
Diagram						
Coxeter	[8,6]^{+} =	[8,6^{+}]^{+} =	[8^{+},6]^{+} =	[8,1^{+},6]^{+} =	[8^{+},6^{+}]^{+} = [1^{+},8,1^{+},6,1^{+}] = = =	
Orbifold	862	664	883	4232	4343	
Radical subgroups
Index		12	24	16	32	
Diagram						
Coxeter		[8,6*]	[8*,6]	[8,6*]^{+}	[8*,6]^{+}	
Orbifold		*444444	*33333333	444444	33333333	

== Related polyhedra and tilings ==
From a Wythoff construction there are fourteen hyperbolic uniform tilings that can be based from the regular order-6 octagonal tiling.

Drawing the tiles colored as red on the original faces, yellow at the original vertices, and blue along the original edges, there are 7 forms with full [8,6] symmetry, and 7 with subsymmetry.

Uniform octagonal/hexagonal tilings
Symmetry: [8,6], (*862)
{8,6}	t{8,6}	r{8,6}	2t{8,6}=t{6,8}	2r{8,6}={6,8}	rr{8,6}	tr{8,6}
Uniform duals
V8^{6}	V6.16.16	V(6.8)^{2}	V8.12.12	V6^{8}	V4.6.4.8	V4.12.16
Alternations
[1^{+},8,6] (*466)	[8^{+},6] (8*3)	[8,1^{+},6] (*4232)	[8,6^{+}] (6*4)	[8,6,1^{+}] (*883)	[(8,6,2^{+})] (2*43)	[8,6]^{+} (862)
h{8,6}	s{8,6}	hr{8,6}	s{6,8}	h{6,8}	hrr{8,6}	sr{8,6}
Alternation duals
V(4.6)^{6}	V3.3.8.3.8.3	V(3.4.4.4)^{2}	V3.4.3.4.3.6	V(3.8)^{8}	V3.4^{5}	V3.3.6.3.8

== See also ==
- Tilings of regular polygons
- List of uniform planar tilings
