= Truncated order-4 octagonal tiling =

Uniform tiling of the hyperbolic plane

Truncated order-4 octagonal tiling
Poincaré disk model of the hyperbolic plane
Type	Hyperbolic uniform tiling
Vertex configuration	4.16.16
Schläfli symbol	t{8,4} tr{8,8} or $t\begin{Bmatrix} 8 \\ 8 \end{Bmatrix}$
Wythoff symbol	2 8 | 8; 2 8 8 |
Coxeter diagram	or
Symmetry group	[8,4], (*842) [8,8], (*882)
Dual	Order-8 tetrakis square tiling
Properties	Vertex-transitive

In geometry, the truncated order-4 octagonal tiling is a uniform tiling of the hyperbolic plane. It has Schläfli symbol of t_{0,1}{8,4}. A secondary construction t_{0,1,2}{8,8} is called a truncated octaoctagonal tiling with two colors of hexakaidecagons.

== Constructions ==
There are two uniform constructions of this tiling, first by the [8,4] kaleidoscope, and second by removing the last mirror, [8,4,1^{+}], gives [8,8], (*882).

Two uniform constructions of 4.8.4.8
Name	Tetraoctagonal	Truncated octaoctagonal
Image		
Symmetry	[8,4] (*842)	[8,8] = [8,4,1^{+}] (*882) =
Symbol	t{8,4}	tr{8,8}
Coxeter diagram		

== Dual tiling ==
The dual tiling, Order-8 tetrakis square tiling has face configuration V4.16.16, and represents the fundamental domains of the [8,8] symmetry group.

== Symmetry ==
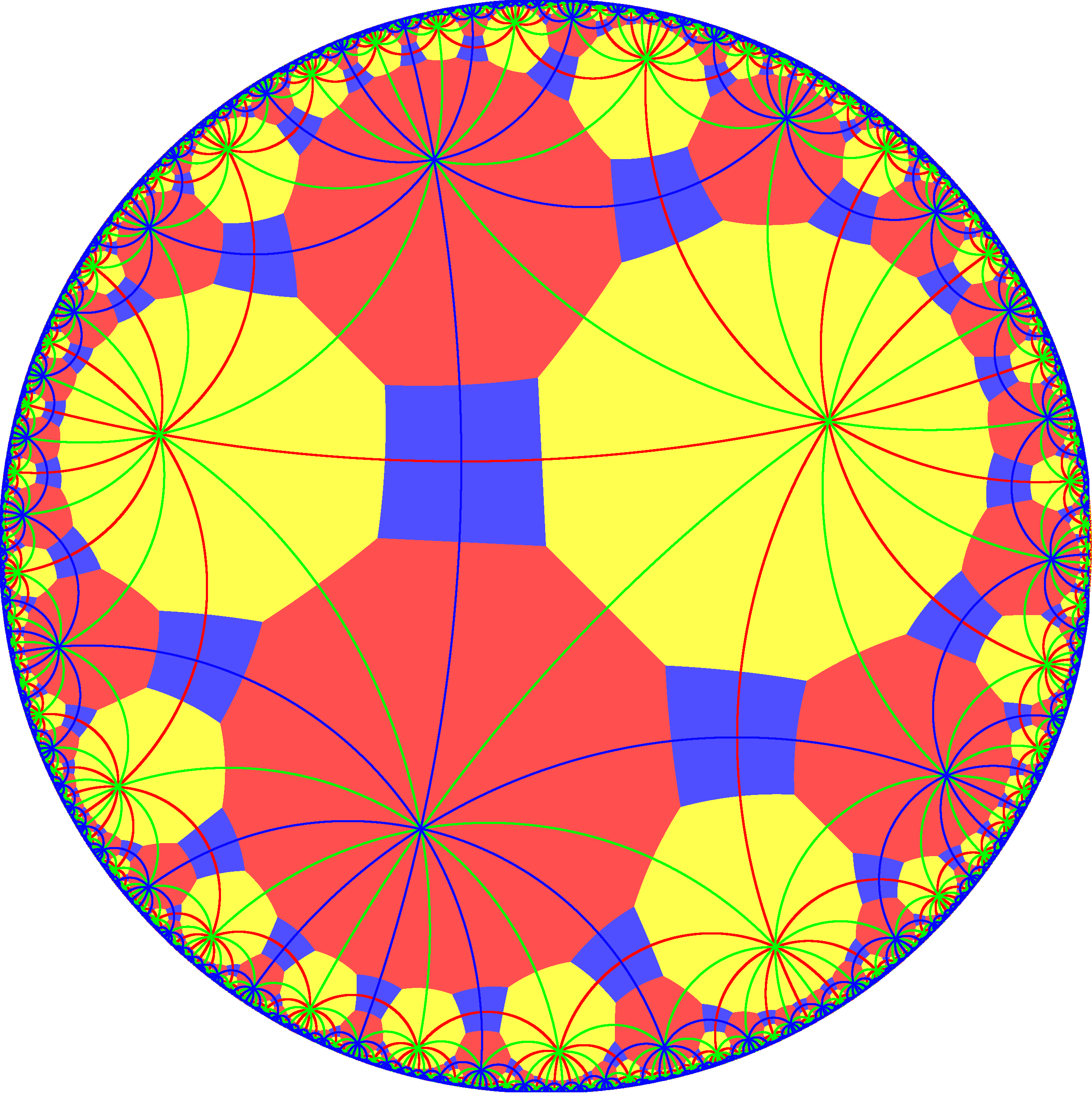
Truncated order-4 octagonal tiling with *882 mirror lines

The dual of the tiling represents the fundamental domains of (*882) orbifold symmetry. From [8,8] symmetry, there are 15 small index subgroup by mirror removal and alternation operators. Mirrors can be removed if its branch orders are all even, and cuts neighboring branch orders in half. Removing two mirrors leaves a half-order gyration point where the removed mirrors met. In these images unique mirrors are colored red, green, and blue, and alternatively colored triangles show the location of gyration points. The [8^{+},8^{+}], (44×) subgroup has narrow lines representing glide reflections. The subgroup index-8 group, [1^{+},8,1^{+},8,1^{+}] (4444) is the commutator subgroup of [8,8].

One larger subgroup is constructed as [8,8*], removing the gyration points of (8*4), index 16 becomes (*44444444), and its direct subgroup [8,8*]^{+}, index 32, (44444444).

The [8,8] symmetry can be doubled by a mirror bisecting the fundamental domain, and creating *884 symmetry.

Small index subgroups of [8,8] (*882)
Index	1	2			4	
Diagram						
Coxeter	[8,8]	[1^{+},8,8] =	[8,8,1^{+}] =	[8,1^{+},8] =	[1^{+},8,8,1^{+}] =	[8^{+},8^{+}]
Orbifold	*882	*884		*4242	*4444	44×
Semidirect subgroups
Diagram						
Coxeter		[8,8^{+}]	[8^{+},8]	[(8,8,2^{+})]	[8,1^{+},8,1^{+}] = = = =	[1^{+},8,1^{+},8] = = = =
Orbifold		8*4		2*44	4*44	
Direct subgroups
Index	2	4			8	
Diagram						
Coxeter	[8,8]^{+}	[8,8^{+}]^{+} =	[8^{+},8]^{+} =	[8,1^{+},8]^{+} =	[8^{+},8^{+}]^{+} = [1^{+},8,1^{+},8,1^{+}] = = =	
Orbifold	882	884		4242	4444	
Radical subgroups
Index		16		32		
Diagram						
Coxeter		[8,8*]	[8*,8]	[8,8*]^{+}	[8*,8]^{+}	
Orbifold		*44444444		44444444		

== Related polyhedra and tiling ==
*n42 symmetry mutation of truncated tilings: 4.2n.2n
Symmetry *n42 [n,4]	Spherical		Euclidean	Compact hyperbolic				Paracomp.
Symmetry *n42 [n,4]	*242 [2,4]	*342 [3,4]	*442 [4,4]	*542 [5,4]	*642 [6,4]	*742 [7,4]	*842 [8,4]...	*∞42 [∞,4]
Truncated figures								
Config.	4.4.4	4.6.6	4.8.8	4.10.10	4.12.12	4.14.14	4.16.16	4.∞.∞
n-kis figures								
Config.	V4.4.4	V4.6.6	V4.8.8	V4.10.10	V4.12.12	V4.14.14	V4.16.16	V4.∞.∞

Uniform octagonal/square tilings
[8,4], (*842) (with [8,8] (*882), [(4,4,4)] (*444) , [∞,4,∞] (*4222) index 2 subsymmetries) (And [(∞,4,∞,4)] (*4242) index 4 subsymmetry)
= = =	=	= = =	=	= =	=	
{8,4}	t{8,4}	r{8,4}	2t{8,4}=t{4,8}	2r{8,4}={4,8}	rr{8,4}	tr{8,4}
Uniform duals
V8^{4}	V4.16.16	V(4.8)^{2}	V8.8.8	V4^{8}	V4.4.4.8	V4.8.16
Alternations
[1^{+},8,4] (*444)	[8^{+},4] (8*2)	[8,1^{+},4] (*4222)	[8,4^{+}] (4*4)	[8,4,1^{+}] (*882)	[(8,4,2^{+})] (2*42)	[8,4]^{+} (842)
=	=	=	=	=	=	
h{8,4}	s{8,4}	hr{8,4}	s{4,8}	h{4,8}	hrr{8,4}	sr{8,4}
Alternation duals
V(4.4)^{4}	V3.(3.8)^{2}	V(4.4.4)^{2}	V(3.4)^{3}	V8^{8}	V4.4^{4}	V3.3.4.3.8

Uniform octaoctagonal tilings
Symmetry: [8,8], (*882)
= =	= =	= =	= =	= =	= =	= =
{8,8}	t{8,8}	r{8,8}	2t{8,8}=t{8,8}	2r{8,8}={8,8}	rr{8,8}	tr{8,8}
Uniform duals
V8^{8}	V8.16.16	V8.8.8.8	V8.16.16	V8^{8}	V4.8.4.8	V4.16.16
Alternations
[1^{+},8,8] (*884)	[8^{+},8] (8*4)	[8,1^{+},8] (*4242)	[8,8^{+}] (8*4)	[8,8,1^{+}] (*884)	[(8,8,2^{+})] (2*44)	[8,8]^{+} (882)
=		=		=	= =	= =
h{8,8}	s{8,8}	hr{8,8}	s{8,8}	h{8,8}	hrr{8,8}	sr{8,8}
Alternation duals
V(4.8)^{8}	V3.4.3.8.3.8	V(4.4)^{4}	V3.4.3.8.3.8	V(4.8)^{8}	V4^{6}	V3.3.8.3.8

== See also ==
- Square tiling
- Tilings of regular polygons
- List of uniform planar tilings
- List of regular polytopes
