= Truncated order-6 pentagonal tiling =

Pentagonal tiling of the hyperbolic plane

Truncated order-6 pentagonal tiling
Poincaré disk model of the hyperbolic plane
Type	Hyperbolic uniform tiling
Vertex configuration	6.10.10
Schläfli symbol	t{5,6} t(5,5,3)
Wythoff symbol	2 6 | 5; 3 5 5 |
Coxeter diagram	
Symmetry group	[6,5], (*652) [(5,5,3)], (*553)
Dual	Order-5 hexakis hexagonal tiling
Properties	Vertex-transitive

In geometry, the truncated order-6 pentagonal tiling is a uniform tiling of the hyperbolic plane. It has Schläfli symbol of t_{1,2}{6,5}.

== Uniform colorings ==
t_{012}(5,5,3)	With mirrors
An alternate construction exists from the [(5,5,3)] family, as the omnitruncation t_{012}(5,5,3). It is shown with two (colors) of decagons.

== Symmetry ==
The dual of this tiling represents the fundamental domains of the *553 symmetry. There are no mirror removal subgroups of [(5,5,3)], but this symmetry group can be doubled to 652 symmetry by adding a bisecting mirror to the fundamental domains.

Small index subgroups of [(5,5,3)]
Type	Reflective domains	Rotational symmetry
Index	1	2
Diagram		
Coxeter (orbifold)	[(5,5,3)] = (*553)	[(5,5,3)]^{+} = (553)

== Related polyhedra and tiling ==
Uniform hexagonal/pentagonal tilings
Symmetry: [6,5], (*652)							[6,5]^{+}, (652)	[6,5^{+}], (5*3)	[1^{+},6,5], (*553)
{6,5}	t{6,5}	r{6,5}	2t{6,5}=t{5,6}	2r{6,5}={5,6}	rr{6,5}	tr{6,5}	sr{6,5}	s{5,6}	h{6,5}
Uniform duals
V6^{5}	V5.12.12	V5.6.5.6	V6.10.10	V5^{6}	V4.5.4.6	V4.10.12	V3.3.5.3.6	V3.3.3.5.3.5	V(3.5)^{5}

[(5,5,3)] reflective symmetry uniform tilings

== See also ==
- Square tiling
- Tilings of regular polygons
- List of uniform planar tilings
- List of regular polytopes
