= Truncated order-8 octagonal tiling =

Uniform tiling of the hyperbolic plane

Truncated order-8 octagonal tiling
Poincaré disk model of the hyperbolic plane
Type	Hyperbolic uniform tiling
Vertex configuration	8.16.16
Schläfli symbol	t{8,8} t(8,8,4)
Wythoff symbol	2 8 | 4
Coxeter diagram	
Symmetry group	[8,8], (*882) [(8,8,4)], (*884)
Dual	Order-8 octakis octagonal tiling
Properties	Vertex-transitive

In geometry, the truncated order-8 octagonal tiling is a uniform tiling of the hyperbolic plane. It has Schläfli symbol of t_{0,1}{8,8}.

== Uniform colorings ==
This tiling can also be constructed in *884 symmetry with 3 colors of faces:

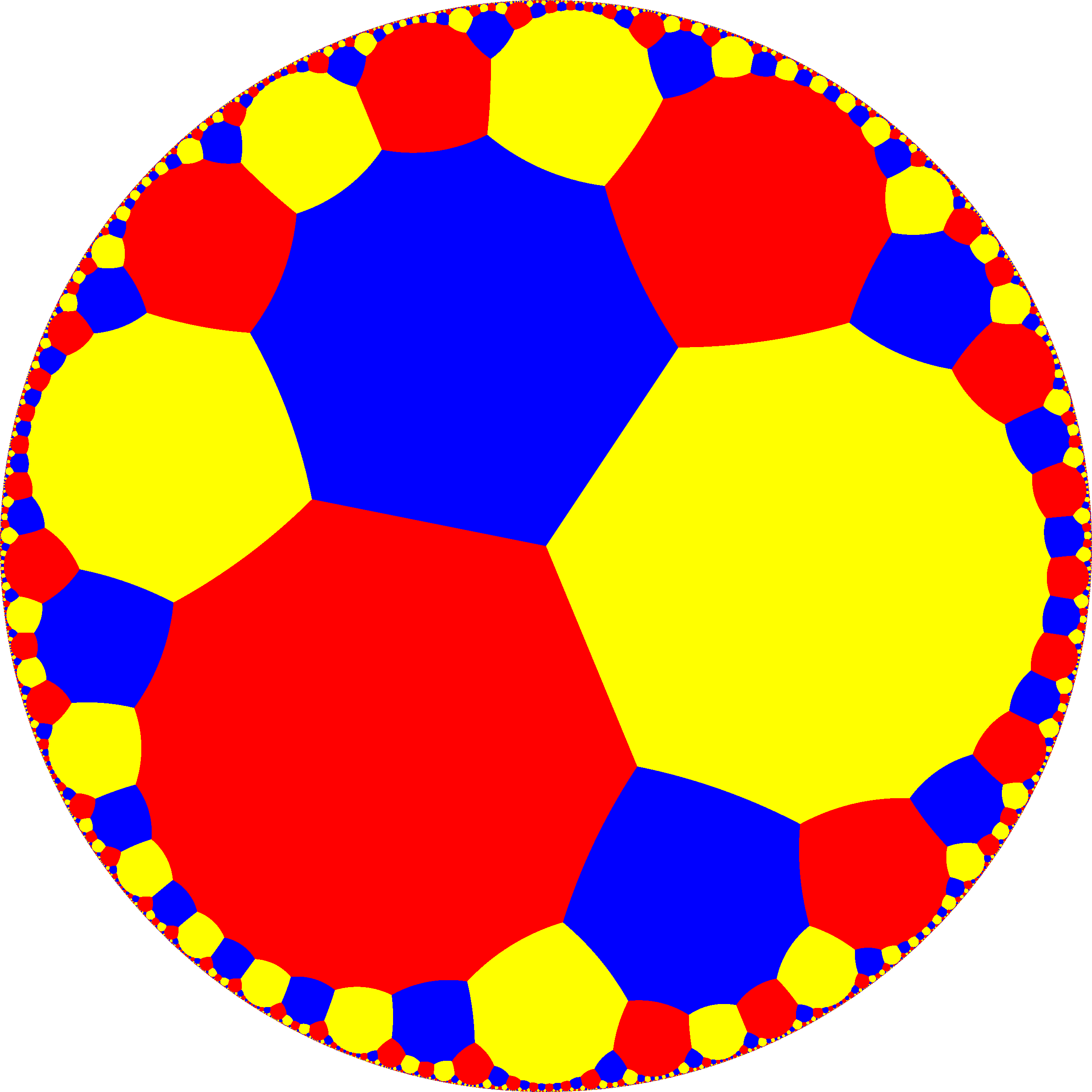

== Related polyhedra and tiling ==
Uniform octaoctagonal tilings
Symmetry: [8,8], (*882)
= =	= =	= =	= =	= =	= =	= =
{8,8}	t{8,8}	r{8,8}	2t{8,8}=t{8,8}	2r{8,8}={8,8}	rr{8,8}	tr{8,8}
Uniform duals
V8^{8}	V8.16.16	V8.8.8.8	V8.16.16	V8^{8}	V4.8.4.8	V4.16.16
Alternations
[1^{+},8,8] (*884)	[8^{+},8] (8*4)	[8,1^{+},8] (*4242)	[8,8^{+}] (8*4)	[8,8,1^{+}] (*884)	[(8,8,2^{+})] (2*44)	[8,8]^{+} (882)
=		=		=	= =	= =
h{8,8}	s{8,8}	hr{8,8}	s{8,8}	h{8,8}	hrr{8,8}	sr{8,8}
Alternation duals
V(4.8)^{8}	V3.4.3.8.3.8	V(4.4)^{4}	V3.4.3.8.3.8	V(4.8)^{8}	V4^{6}	V3.3.8.3.8

=== Symmetry ===
The dual of the tiling represents the fundamental domains of (*884) orbifold symmetry. From [(8,8,4)] (*884) symmetry, there are 15 small index subgroup (11 unique) by mirror removal and alternation operators. Mirrors can be removed if its branch orders are all even, and cuts neighboring branch orders in half. Removing two mirrors leaves a half-order gyration point where the removed mirrors met. In these images fundamental domains are alternately colored black and white, and mirrors exist on the boundaries between colors. The symmetry can be doubled to 882 symmetry by adding a bisecting mirror across the fundamental domains. The subgroup index-8 group, [(1^{+},8,1^{+},8,1^{+},4)] (442442) is the commutator subgroup of [(8,8,4)].

Small index subgroups of [(8,8,4)] (*884)
Fundamental domains						
Subgroup index	1	2			4	
Coxeter	[(8,8,4)]	[(1^{+},8,8,4)]	[(8,8,1^{+},4)]	[(8,1^{+},8,4)]	[(1^{+},8,8,1^{+},4)]	[(8^{+},8^{+},4)]
orbifold	*884	*8482		*4444	2*4444	442×
Coxeter		[(8,8^{+},4)]	[(8^{+},8,4)]	[(8,8,4^{+})]	[(8,1^{+},8,1^{+},4)]	[(1^{+},8,1^{+},8,4)]
Orbifold		8*42		4*44	4*4242	
Direct subgroups
Subgroup index	2	4			8	
Coxeter	[(8,8,4)]^{+}	[(1^{+},8,8^{+},4)]	[(8^{+},8,1^{+},4)]	[(8,1^{+},8,4^{+})]	[(1^{+},8,1^{+},8,1^{+},4)] = [(8^{+},8^{+},4^{+})]	
Orbifold	844	8482		4444	442442	

== See also ==
- Square tiling
- Tilings of regular polygons
- List of uniform planar tilings
- List of regular polytopes
