= Pentahexagonal tiling =

Type of geometrical tiling

Pentahexagonal tiling
Poincaré disk model of the hyperbolic plane
Type	Hyperbolic uniform tiling
Vertex configuration	(5.6^{2}
Schläfli symbol	r{6,5} or $\begin{Bmatrix} 6 \\ 5 \end{Bmatrix}$
Wythoff symbol	2 | 6 5
Coxeter diagram	
Symmetry group	[6,5], (*652)
Dual	Order-6-5 rhombille tiling
Properties	Vertex-transitive edge-transitive

In geometry, the pentahexagonal tiling is a uniform tiling of the hyperbolic plane. It has Schläfli symbol of r{6,5} or t_{1}{6,5}.

== Uniform colorings ==
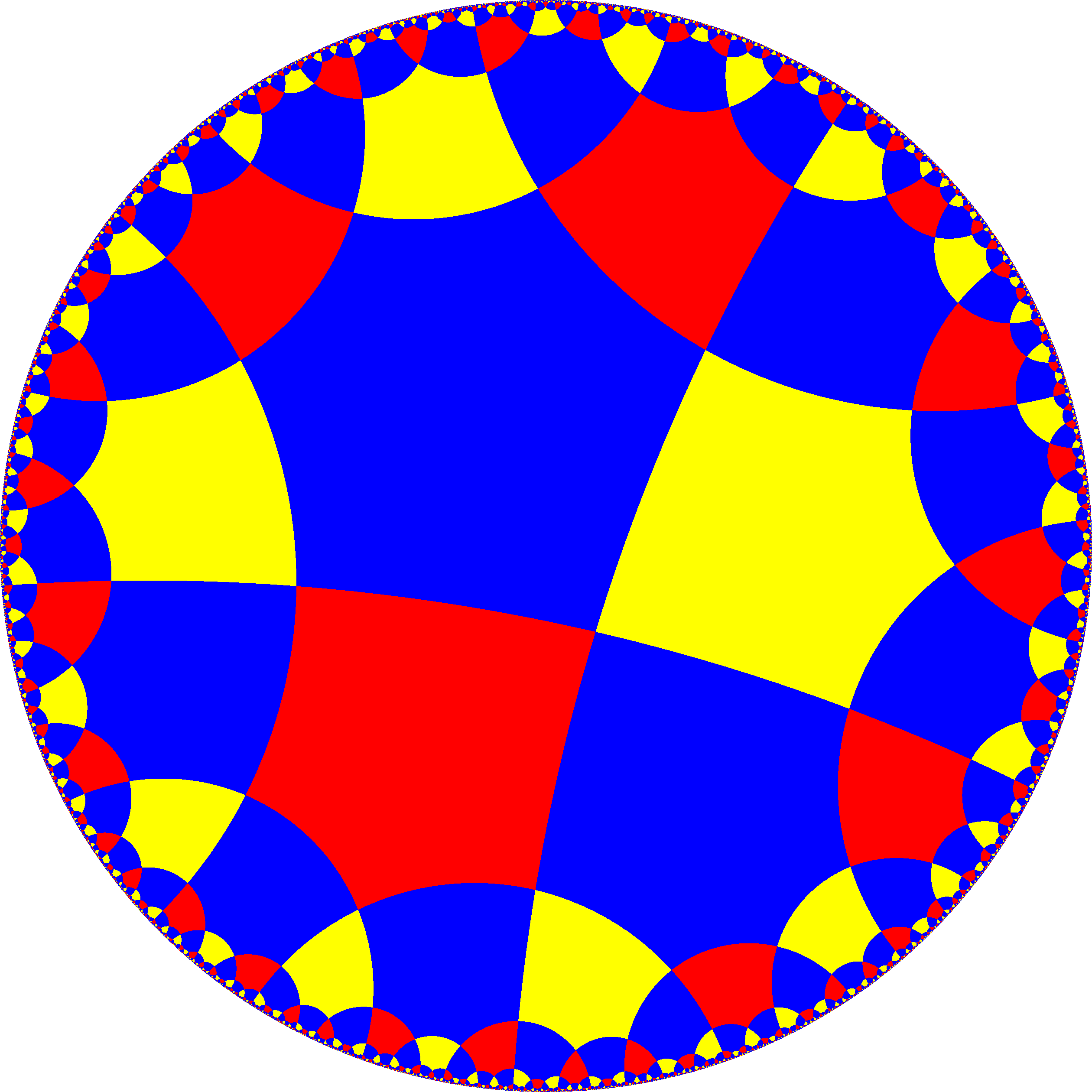

== Related polyhedra and tiling ==
Uniform hexagonal/pentagonal tilings
Symmetry: [6,5], (*652)							[6,5]^{+}, (652)	[6,5^{+}], (5*3)	[1^{+},6,5], (*553)
{6,5}	t{6,5}	r{6,5}	2t{6,5}=t{5,6}	2r{6,5}={5,6}	rr{6,5}	tr{6,5}	sr{6,5}	s{5,6}	h{6,5}
Uniform duals
V6^{5}	V5.12.12	V5.6.5.6	V6.10.10	V5^{6}	V4.5.4.6	V4.10.12	V3.3.5.3.6	V3.3.3.5.3.5	V(3.5)^{5}

*5n2 symmetry mutations of quasiregular tilings: (5.n)^{2}
Symmetry *5n2 [n,5]	Spherical	Hyperbolic					Paracompact	Noncompact
Symmetry *5n2 [n,5]	*352 [3,5]	*452 [4,5]	*552 [5,5]	*652 [6,5]	*752 [7,5]	*852 [8,5]...	*∞52 [∞,5]	[ni,5]
Figures								
Config.	(5.3)^{2}	(5.4)^{2}	(5.5)^{2}	(5.6)^{2}	(5.7)^{2}	(5.8)^{2}	(5.∞)^{2}	(5.ni)^{2}
Rhombic figures								
Config.	V(5.3)^{2}	V(5.4)^{2}	V(5.5)^{2}	V(5.6)^{2}	V(5.7)^{2}	V(5.8)^{2}	V(5.∞)^{2}	V(5.∞)^{2}

Symmetry mutation of quasiregular tilings: (6.n)^{2}
Symmetry *6n2 [n,6]	Euclidean	Compact hyperbolic					Paracompact	Noncompact
Symmetry *6n2 [n,6]	*632 [3,6]	*642 [4,6]	*652 [5,6]	*662 [6,6]	*762 [7,6]	*862 [8,6]...	*∞62 [∞,6]	[iπ/λ,6]
Quasiregular figures configuration	6.3.6.3	6.4.6.4	6.5.6.5	6.6.6.6	6.7.6.7	6.8.6.8	6.∞.6.∞	6.∞.6.∞
Dual figures
Rhombic figures configuration	V6.3.6.3	V6.4.6.4	V6.5.6.5	V6.6.6.6	V6.7.6.7	V6.8.6.8	V6.∞.6.∞	

[(5,5,3)] reflective symmetry uniform tilings

== See also ==
- Square tiling
- Tilings of regular polygons
- List of uniform planar tilings
- List of regular polytopes
