= Rhombipentahexagonal tiling =

Uniform tiling of the hyperbolic plane in geometry

Rhombipentahexagonal tiling
Poincaré disk model of the hyperbolic plane
Type	Hyperbolic uniform tiling
Vertex configuration	5.4.6.4
Schläfli symbol	rr{6,5} or $r\begin{Bmatrix} 6 \\ 5 \end{Bmatrix}$
Wythoff symbol	5 | 6 2
Coxeter diagram	
Symmetry group	[6,5], (*652)
Dual	Deltoidal pentahexagonal tiling
Properties	Vertex-transitive

In geometry, the rhombipentahexagonal tiling is a uniform tiling of the hyperbolic plane. It has Schläfli symbol of t_{0,2}{6,5}.

== Related polyhedra and tiling ==
Uniform hexagonal/pentagonal tilings
Symmetry: [6,5], (*652)							[6,5]^{+}, (652)	[6,5^{+}], (5*3)	[1^{+},6,5], (*553)
{6,5}	t{6,5}	r{6,5}	2t{6,5}=t{5,6}	2r{6,5}={5,6}	rr{6,5}	tr{6,5}	sr{6,5}	s{5,6}	h{6,5}
Uniform duals
V6^{5}	V5.12.12	V5.6.5.6	V6.10.10	V5^{6}	V4.5.4.6	V4.10.12	V3.3.5.3.6	V3.3.3.5.3.5	V(3.5)^{5}

== See also ==
- Square tiling
- Tilings of regular polygons
- List of uniform planar tilings
- List of regular polytopes
