= Truncated pentahexagonal tiling =

Semi-regular arrangement of squares, decagons, and dodecagons

Truncated pentahexagonal tiling
Poincaré disk model of the hyperbolic plane
Type	Hyperbolic uniform tiling
Vertex configuration	4.10.12
Schläfli symbol	tr{6,5} or $t\begin{Bmatrix} 6 \\ 5 \end{Bmatrix}$
Wythoff symbol	2 6 5 |
Coxeter diagram	
Symmetry group	[6,5], (*652)
Dual	Order 5-6 kisrhombille
Properties	Vertex-transitive

In geometry, the truncated tetrahexagonal tiling is a semiregular tiling of the hyperbolic plane. There are one square, one decagon, and one dodecagon on each vertex. It has Schläfli symbol of t_{0,1,2}{6,5}. Its name is somewhat misleading: literal geometric truncation of pentahexagonal tiling produces rectangles instead of squares.

== Dual tiling ==
The dual tiling is called an order-5-6 kisrhombille tiling, made as a complete bisection of the order-5 hexagonal tiling, here with triangles shown in alternating colors. This tiling represents the fundamental triangular domains of [6,5] (*652) symmetry.

== Symmetry ==
There are four small index subgroup from [6,5] by mirror removal and alternation. In these images fundamental domains are alternately colored black and white, and mirrors exist on the boundaries between colors.

Small index subgroups of [6,5], (*652)
Index	1	2		6
Diagram				
Coxeter (orbifold)	[6,5] = (*652)	[1^{+},6,5] = = (*553)	[6,5^{+}] = (5*3)	[6,5^{*}] = (*33333)
Direct subgroups
Index	2	4		12
Diagram				
Coxeter (orbifold)	[6,5]^{+} = (652)	[6,5^{+}]^{+} = = (553)		[6,5^{*}]^{+} = (33333)

== Related polyhedra and tilings ==
From a Wythoff construction there are fourteen hyperbolic uniform tilings that can be based from the regular order-5 hexagonal tiling.

Drawing the tiles colored as red on the original faces, yellow at the original vertices, and blue along the original edges, there are seven forms with full [6,5] symmetry, and three with subsymmetry.

Uniform hexagonal/pentagonal tilings
Symmetry: [6,5], (*652)							[6,5]^{+}, (652)	[6,5^{+}], (5*3)	[1^{+},6,5], (*553)
{6,5}	t{6,5}	r{6,5}	2t{6,5}=t{5,6}	2r{6,5}={5,6}	rr{6,5}	tr{6,5}	sr{6,5}	s{5,6}	h{6,5}
Uniform duals
V6^{5}	V5.12.12	V5.6.5.6	V6.10.10	V5^{6}	V4.5.4.6	V4.10.12	V3.3.5.3.6	V3.3.3.5.3.5	V(3.5)^{5}

== See also ==
- Tilings of regular polygons
- List of uniform planar tilings
