= Order-4 octagonal tiling =

Regular tiling of the hyperbolic plane

Order-4 octagonal tiling
Poincaré disk model of the hyperbolic plane
Type	Hyperbolic regular tiling
Vertex configuration	8^{4}
Schläfli symbol	{8,4} r{8,8}
Wythoff symbol	4 | 8 2
Coxeter diagram	or
Symmetry group	[8,4], (*842) [8,8], (*882)
Dual	Order-8 square tiling
Properties	Vertex-transitive, edge-transitive, face-transitive

In geometry, the order-4 octagonal tiling is a regular tiling of the hyperbolic plane. It has Schläfli symbol of {8,4}. Its checkerboard coloring can be called a octaoctagonal tiling, and Schläfli symbol of r{8,8}.

== Uniform constructions ==
There are four uniform constructions of this tiling, three of them as constructed by mirror removal from the [8,8] kaleidoscope. Removing the mirror between the order 2 and 4 points, [8,8,1^{+}], gives [(8,8,4)], (*884) symmetry. Removing two mirrors as [8,4^{*}], leaves remaining mirrors *4444 symmetry.

Four uniform constructions of 8.8.8.8
Uniform Coloring				
Symmetry	[8,4] (*842)	[8,8] (*882) =	[(8,4,8)] = [8,8,1^{+}] (*884) = =	[1^{+},8,8,1^{+}] (*4444) =
Symbol	{8,4}	r{8,8}	r(8,4,8) = r{8,8}1/2	r{8,4}1/8 = r{8,8}1/4
Coxeter diagram			= =	= = =

== Symmetry ==
This tiling represents a hyperbolic kaleidoscope of 8 mirrors meeting as edges of a regular hexagon. This symmetry by orbifold notation is called (*22222222) or (*2^{8}) with 8 order-2 mirror intersections. In Coxeter notation can be represented as [8^{*},4], removing two of three mirrors (passing through the octagon center) in the [8,4] symmetry. Adding a bisecting mirror through 2 vertices of an octagonal fundamental domain defines a trapezohedral *4422 symmetry. Adding 4 bisecting mirrors through the vertices defines *444 symmetry. Adding 4 bisecting mirrors through the edge defines *4222 symmetry. Adding all 8 bisectors leads to full *842 symmetry.

*444	*4222	*832

The kaleidoscopic domains can be seen as bicolored octagonal tiling, representing mirror images of the fundamental domain. This coloring represents the uniform tiling r{8,8}, a quasiregular tiling and it can be called a octaoctagonal tiling.

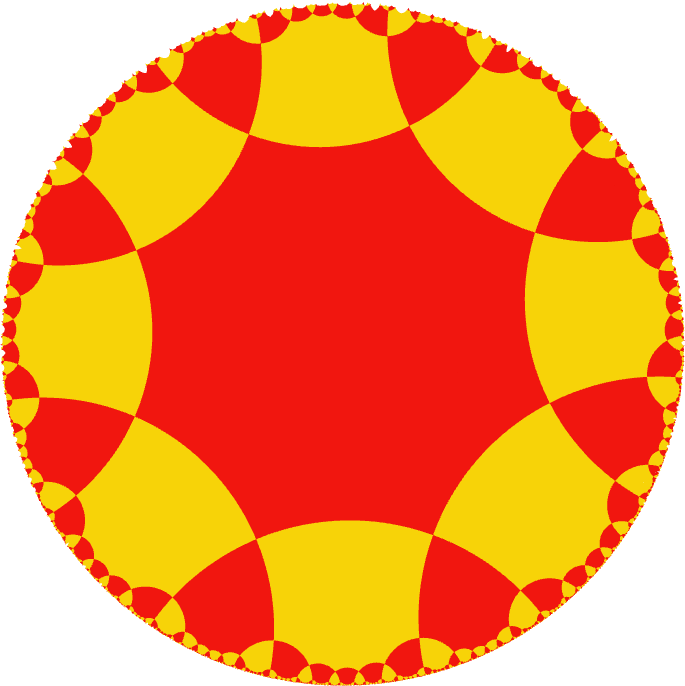

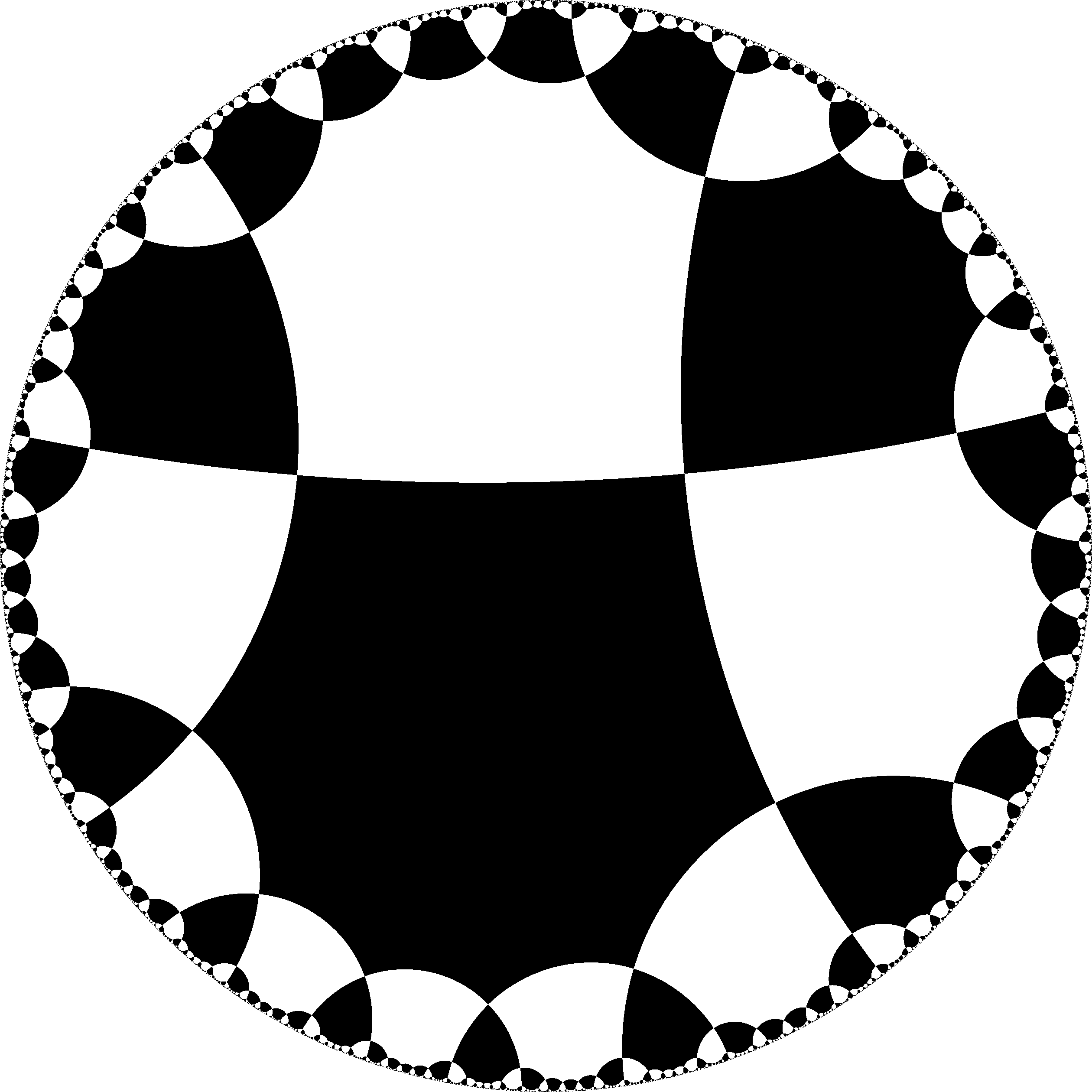

== Related polyhedra and tiling ==
This tiling is topologically related as a part of sequence of regular tilings with octagonal faces, starting with the octagonal tiling, with Schläfli symbol {8,n}, and Coxeter diagram, progressing to infinity.

*n42 symmetry mutation of regular tilings: {n,4}
Spherical		Euclidean	Hyperbolic tilings				
2^{4}	3^{4}	4^{4}	5^{4}	6^{4}	7^{4}	8^{4}	...∞^{4}

Regular tilings: {n,8}
Spherical	Hyperbolic tilings							
{2,8}	{3,8}	{4,8}	{5,8}	{6,8}	{7,8}	{8,8}	...	{∞,8}

This tiling is also topologically related as a part of sequence of regular polyhedra and tilings with four faces per vertex, starting with the octahedron, with Schläfli symbol {n,4}, and Coxeter diagram, with n progressing to infinity.

{3,4}	{4,4}	{5,4}	{6,4}	{7,4}	{8,4}	...	{∞,4}

Uniform octagonal/square tilings
[8,4], (*842) (with [8,8] (*882), [(4,4,4)] (*444) , [∞,4,∞] (*4222) index 2 subsymmetries) (And [(∞,4,∞,4)] (*4242) index 4 subsymmetry)
= = =	=	= = =	=	= =	=	
{8,4}	t{8,4}	r{8,4}	2t{8,4}=t{4,8}	2r{8,4}={4,8}	rr{8,4}	tr{8,4}
Uniform duals
V8^{4}	V4.16.16	V(4.8)^{2}	V8.8.8	V4^{8}	V4.4.4.8	V4.8.16
Alternations
[1^{+},8,4] (*444)	[8^{+},4] (8*2)	[8,1^{+},4] (*4222)	[8,4^{+}] (4*4)	[8,4,1^{+}] (*882)	[(8,4,2^{+})] (2*42)	[8,4]^{+} (842)
=	=	=	=	=	=	
h{8,4}	s{8,4}	hr{8,4}	s{4,8}	h{4,8}	hrr{8,4}	sr{8,4}
Alternation duals
V(4.4)^{4}	V3.(3.8)^{2}	V(4.4.4)^{2}	V(3.4)^{3}	V8^{8}	V4.4^{4}	V3.3.4.3.8

Uniform octaoctagonal tilings
Symmetry: [8,8], (*882)
= =	= =	= =	= =	= =	= =	= =
{8,8}	t{8,8}	r{8,8}	2t{8,8}=t{8,8}	2r{8,8}={8,8}	rr{8,8}	tr{8,8}
Uniform duals
V8^{8}	V8.16.16	V8.8.8.8	V8.16.16	V8^{8}	V4.8.4.8	V4.16.16
Alternations
[1^{+},8,8] (*884)	[8^{+},8] (8*4)	[8,1^{+},8] (*4242)	[8,8^{+}] (8*4)	[8,8,1^{+}] (*884)	[(8,8,2^{+})] (2*44)	[8,8]^{+} (882)
=		=		=	= =	= =
h{8,8}	s{8,8}	hr{8,8}	s{8,8}	h{8,8}	hrr{8,8}	sr{8,8}
Alternation duals
V(4.8)^{8}	V3.4.3.8.3.8	V(4.4)^{4}	V3.4.3.8.3.8	V(4.8)^{8}	V4^{6}	V3.3.8.3.8

== See also ==
- Square tiling
- Tilings of regular polygons
- List of uniform planar tilings
- List of regular polytopes
