= Uniform tiling symmetry mutations =

Example *n32 symmetry mutations
Spherical tilings (n = 3..5)
*332	*432	*532
Euclidean plane tiling (n = 6)
*632
Hyperbolic plane tilings (n = 7...∞)
*732	*832	... *∞32

In geometry, a symmetry mutation is a mapping of fundamental domains between two symmetry groups. They are compactly expressed in orbifold notation. These mutations can occur from spherical tilings to Euclidean tilings to hyperbolic tilings. Hyperbolic tilings can also be divided between compact, paracompact and divergent cases.

The uniform tilings are the simplest application of these mutations, although more complex patterns can be expressed within a fundamental domain.

This article expressed progressive sequences of uniform tilings within symmetry families.

== Mutations of orbifolds ==
Orbifolds with the same structure can be mutated between different symmetry classes, including across curvature domains from spherical, to Euclidean to hyperbolic. This table shows mutation classes. This table is not complete for possible hyperbolic orbifolds.

Orbifold	Spherical	Euclidean	Hyperbolic
o	-	o	-
pp	22, 33 ...	∞∞	-
*pp	*22, *33 ...	*∞∞	-
p*	2*, 3* ...	∞*	-
p×	2×, 3× ...	∞×	
**	-	**	-
*×	-	*×	-
××	-	××	-
ppp	222	333	444 ...
pp*	-	22*	33* ...
pp×	-	22×	33×, 44× ...
pqq	222, 322 ... , 233	244	255 ..., 433 ...
pqr	234, 235	236	237 ..., 245 ...
pq*	-	-	23*, 24* ...
pq×	-	-	23×, 24× ...
p*q	2*2, 2*3 ...	3*3, 4*2	5*2 5*3 ..., 4*3, 4*4 ..., 3*4, 3*5 ...
*p*	-	-	*2* ...
*p×	-	-	*2× ...
pppp	-	2222	3333 ...
pppq	-	-	2223...
ppqq	-	-	2233
pp*p	-	-	22*2 ...
p*qr	-	2*22	3*22 ..., 2*32 ...
*ppp	*222	*333	*444 ...
*pqq	*p22, *233	*244	*255 ..., *344...
*pqr	*234, *235	*236	*237..., *245..., *345 ...
p*ppp	-	-	2*222
*pqrs	-	*2222	*2223...
*ppppp	-	-	*22222 ...
...

== *n22 symmetry ==
=== Regular tilings ===
Family of regular hosohedra · *n22 symmetry mutations of regular hosohedral tilings: nn
Space	Spherical						Euclidean
Tiling name	Henagonal hosohedron	Digonal hosohedron	Trigonal hosohedron	Square hosohedron	Pentagonal hosohedron	...	Apeirogonal hosohedron
Tiling image						...	
Schläfli symbol	{2,1}	{2,2}	{2,3}	{2,4}	{2,5}	...	{2,∞}
Coxeter diagram						...	
Faces and edges	1	2	3	4	5	...	∞
Vertices	2	2	2	2	2	...	2
Vertex config.	2	2.2	2^{3}	2^{4}	2^{5}	...	2^{∞}

Family of regular dihedra · *n22 symmetry mutations of regular dihedral tilings: nn
Space	Spherical						Euclidean
Tiling name	Monogonal dihedron	Digonal dihedron	Trigonal dihedron	Square dihedron	Pentagonal dihedron	...	Apeirogonal dihedron
Tiling image						...	
Schläfli symbol	{1,2}	{2,2}	{3,2}	{4,2}	{5,2}	...	{∞,2}
Coxeter diagram						...	
Faces	2 {1}	2 {2}	2 {3}	2 {4}	2 {5}	...	2 {∞}
Edges and vertices	1	2	3	4	5	...	∞
Vertex config.	1.1	2.2	3.3	4.4	5.5	...	∞.∞

=== Prism tilings ===
*n22 symmetry mutations of uniform prisms: n.4.4
Space	Spherical										Euclidean
Tiling											
Config.	3.4.4	4.4.4	5.4.4	6.4.4	7.4.4	8.4.4	9.4.4	10.4.4	11.4.4	12.4.4	...∞.4.4

=== Antiprism tilings ===
*n22 symmetry mutations of antiprism tilings: Vn.3.3.3
Space	Spherical							Euclidean
Tiling								
Config.	2.3.3.3	3.3.3.3	4.3.3.3	5.3.3.3	6.3.3.3	7.3.3.3	8.3.3.3	...∞.3.3.3

== *n32 symmetry ==
=== Regular tilings ===
*n32 symmetry mutation of regular tilings: {3,n}
Spherical				Euclid.	Compact hyper.		Paraco.	Noncompact hyperbolic			
3.3	3^{3}	3^{4}	3^{5}	3^{6}	3^{7}	3^{8}	3^{∞}	3^{12i}	3^{9i}	3^{6i}	3^{3i}

*n32 symmetry mutation of regular tilings: {n,3}
Spherical				Euclidean	Compact hyperb.		Paraco.	Noncompact hyperbolic			
{2,3}	{3,3}	{4,3}	{5,3}	{6,3}	{7,3}	{8,3}	{∞,3}	{12i,3}	{9i,3}	{6i,3}	{3i,3}

=== Truncated tilings ===
*n32 symmetry mutation of truncated tilings: t{n,3}
Symmetry *n32 [n,3]	Spherical				Euclid.	Compact hyperb.		Paraco.	Noncompact hyperbolic		
Symmetry *n32 [n,3]	*232 [2,3]	*332 [3,3]	*432 [4,3]	*532 [5,3]	*632 [6,3]	*732 [7,3]	*832 [8,3]...	*∞32 [∞,3]	[12i,3]	[9i,3]	[6i,3]
Truncated figures											
Symbol	t{2,3}	t{3,3}	t{4,3}	t{5,3}	t{6,3}	t{7,3}	t{8,3}	t{∞,3}	t{12i,3}	t{9i,3}	t{6i,3}
Triakis figures											
Config.	V3.4.4	V3.6.6	V3.8.8	V3.10.10	V3.12.12	V3.14.14	V3.16.16	V3.∞.∞			

*n32 symmetry mutation of truncated tilings: n.6.6
Sym. *n42 [n,3]	Spherical				Euclid.	Compact		Parac.	Noncompact hyperbolic		
Sym. *n42 [n,3]	*232 [2,3]	*332 [3,3]	*432 [4,3]	*532 [5,3]	*632 [6,3]	*732 [7,3]	*832 [8,3]...	*∞32 [∞,3]	[12i,3]	[9i,3]	[6i,3]
Truncated figures											
Config.	2.6.6	3.6.6	4.6.6	5.6.6	6.6.6	7.6.6	8.6.6	∞.6.6	12i.6.6	9i.6.6	6i.6.6
n-kis figures											
Config.	V2.6.6	V3.6.6	V4.6.6	V5.6.6	V6.6.6	V7.6.6	V8.6.6	V∞.6.6	V12i.6.6	V9i.6.6	V6i.6.6

=== Quasiregular tilings ===
Quasiregular tilings: (3.n)^{2}
Sym. *n32 [n,3]	Spherical			Euclid.	Compact hyperb.		Paraco.	Noncompact hyperbolic		
Sym. *n32 [n,3]	*332 [3,3] T_{d}	*432 [4,3] O_{h}	*532 [5,3] I_{h}	*632 [6,3] p6m	*732 [7,3]	*832 [8,3]...	*∞32 [∞,3]	[12i,3]	[9i,3]	[6i,3]
Figure										
Figure										
Vertex	(3.3)^{2}	(3.4)^{2}	(3.5)^{2}	(3.6)^{2}	(3.7)^{2}	(3.8)^{2}	(3.∞)^{2}	(3.12i)^{2}	(3.9i)^{2}	(3.6i)^{2}
Schläfli	r{3,3}	r{3,4}	r{3,5}	r{3,6}	r{3,7}	r{3,8}	r{3,∞}	r{3,12i}	r{3,9i}	r{3,6i}
Coxeter										
Dual uniform figures
Dual conf.	V(3.3)^{2}	V(3.4)^{2}	V(3.5)^{2}	V(3.6)^{2}	V(3.7)^{2}	V(3.8)^{2}	V(3.∞)^{2}			

Symmetry mutations of dual quasiregular tilings: V(3.n)^{2}
*n32	Spherical			Euclidean	Hyperbolic		
*n32	*332	*432	*532	*632	*732	*832...	*∞32
Tiling							
Conf.	V(3.3)^{2}	V(3.4)^{2}	V(3.5)^{2}	V(3.6)^{2}	V(3.7)^{2}	V(3.8)^{2}	V(3.∞)^{2}

=== Expanded tilings ===
*n32 symmetry mutation of expanded tilings: 3.4.n.4
Symmetry *n32 [n,3]	Spherical				Euclid.	Compact hyperb.		Paraco.	Noncompact hyperbolic		
Symmetry *n32 [n,3]	*232 [2,3]	*332 [3,3]	*432 [4,3]	*532 [5,3]	*632 [6,3]	*732 [7,3]	*832 [8,3]...	*∞32 [∞,3]	[12i,3]	[9i,3]	[6i,3]
Figure											
Config.	3.4.2.4	3.4.3.4	3.4.4.4	3.4.5.4	3.4.6.4	3.4.7.4	3.4.8.4	3.4.∞.4	3.4.12i.4	3.4.9i.4	3.4.6i.4

*n32 symmetry mutation of dual expanded tilings: V3.4.n.4
Symmetry *n32 [n,3]	Spherical				Euclid.	Compact hyperb.		Paraco.
Symmetry *n32 [n,3]	*232 [2,3]	*332 [3,3]	*432 [4,3]	*532 [5,3]	*632 [6,3]	*732 [7,3]	*832 [8,3]...	*∞32 [∞,3]
Figure Config.	V3.4.2.4	V3.4.3.4	V3.4.4.4	V3.4.5.4	V3.4.6.4	V3.4.7.4	V3.4.8.4	V3.4.∞.4

=== Omnitruncated tilings ===
*n32 symmetry mutation of omnitruncated tilings: 4.6.2n
Sym. *n32 [n,3]	Spherical				Euclid.	Compact hyperb.		Paraco.	Noncompact hyperbolic			
Sym. *n32 [n,3]	*232 [2,3]	*332 [3,3]	*432 [4,3]	*532 [5,3]	*632 [6,3]	*732 [7,3]	*832 [8,3]	*∞32 [∞,3]	[12i,3]	[9i,3]	[6i,3]	[3i,3]
Figures												
Config.	4.6.4	4.6.6	4.6.8	4.6.10	4.6.12	4.6.14	4.6.16	4.6.∞	4.6.24i	4.6.18i	4.6.12i	4.6.6i
Duals												
Config.	V4.6.4	V4.6.6	V4.6.8	V4.6.10	V4.6.12	V4.6.14	V4.6.16	V4.6.∞	V4.6.24i	V4.6.18i	V4.6.12i	V4.6.6i

=== Snub tilings ===
n32 symmetry mutations of snub tilings: 3.3.3.3.n
Symmetry n32	Spherical				Euclidean	Compact hyperbolic		Paracomp.
Symmetry n32	232	332	432	532	632	732	832	∞32
Snub figures								
Config.	3.3.3.3.2	3.3.3.3.3	3.3.3.3.4	3.3.3.3.5	3.3.3.3.6	3.3.3.3.7	3.3.3.3.8	3.3.3.3.∞
Gyro figures								
Config.	V3.3.3.3.2	V3.3.3.3.3	V3.3.3.3.4	V3.3.3.3.5	V3.3.3.3.6	V3.3.3.3.7	V3.3.3.3.8	V3.3.3.3.∞

== *n42 symmetry ==
=== Regular tilings ===
*n42 symmetry mutation of regular tilings: {4,n}
Spherical	Euclidean	Compact hyperbolic				Paracompact
{4,3}	{4,4}	{4,5}	{4,6}	{4,7}	{4,8}...	{4,∞}

*n42 symmetry mutation of regular tilings: {n,4}
Spherical		Euclidean	Hyperbolic tilings				
2^{4}	3^{4}	4^{4}	5^{4}	6^{4}	7^{4}	8^{4}	...∞^{4}

=== Quasiregular tilings ===
*n42 symmetry mutations of quasiregular tilings: (4.n)^{2}
Symmetry *4n2 [n,4]	Spherical	Euclidean	Compact hyperbolic				Paracompact	Noncompact
Symmetry *4n2 [n,4]	*342 [3,4]	*442 [4,4]	*542 [5,4]	*642 [6,4]	*742 [7,4]	*842 [8,4]...	*∞42 [∞,4]	[ni,4]
Figures								
Config.	(4.3)^{2}	(4.4)^{2}	(4.5)^{2}	(4.6)^{2}	(4.7)^{2}	(4.8)^{2}	(4.∞)^{2}	(4.ni)^{2}

*n42 symmetry mutations of quasiregular dual tilings: V(4.n)^{2}
Symmetry *4n2 [n,4]	Spherical	Euclidean	Compact hyperbolic				Paracompact	Noncompact
Symmetry *4n2 [n,4]	*342 [3,4]	*442 [4,4]	*542 [5,4]	*642 [6,4]	*742 [7,4]	*842 [8,4]...	*∞42 [∞,4]	[iπ/λ,4]
Tiling Conf.	V4.3.4.3	V4.4.4.4	V4.5.4.5	V4.6.4.6	V4.7.4.7	V4.8.4.8	V4.∞.4.∞	V4.∞.4.∞

=== Truncated tilings ===
*n42 symmetry mutation of truncated tilings: 4.2n.2n
Symmetry *n42 [n,4]	Spherical		Euclidean	Compact hyperbolic				Paracomp.
Symmetry *n42 [n,4]	*242 [2,4]	*342 [3,4]	*442 [4,4]	*542 [5,4]	*642 [6,4]	*742 [7,4]	*842 [8,4]...	*∞42 [∞,4]
Truncated figures								
Config.	4.4.4	4.6.6	4.8.8	4.10.10	4.12.12	4.14.14	4.16.16	4.∞.∞
n-kis figures								
Config.	V4.4.4	V4.6.6	V4.8.8	V4.10.10	V4.12.12	V4.14.14	V4.16.16	V4.∞.∞

*n42 symmetry mutation of truncated tilings: n.8.8
Symmetry *n42 [n,4]	Spherical		Euclidean	Compact hyperbolic				Paracompact
Symmetry *n42 [n,4]	*242 [2,4]	*342 [3,4]	*442 [4,4]	*542 [5,4]	*642 [6,4]	*742 [7,4]	*842 [8,4]...	*∞42 [∞,4]
Truncated figures								
Config.	2.8.8	3.8.8	4.8.8	5.8.8	6.8.8	7.8.8	8.8.8	∞.8.8
n-kis figures								
Config.	V2.8.8	V3.8.8	V4.8.8	V5.8.8	V6.8.8	V7.8.8	V8.8.8	V∞.8.8

=== Expanded tilings ===
*n42 symmetry mutation of expanded tilings: n.4.4.4
Symmetry [n,4], (*n42)	Spherical	Euclidean	Compact hyperbolic				Paracomp.
Symmetry [n,4], (*n42)	*342 [3,4]	*442 [4,4]	*542 [5,4]	*642 [6,4]	*742 [7,4]	*842 [8,4]	*∞42 [∞,4]
Expanded figures							
Config.	3.4.4.4	4.4.4.4	5.4.4.4	6.4.4.4	7.4.4.4	8.4.4.4	∞.4.4.4
Rhombic figures config.	V3.4.4.4	V4.4.4.4	V5.4.4.4	V6.4.4.4	V7.4.4.4	V8.4.4.4	V∞.4.4.4

=== Omnitruncated tilings ===
*n42 symmetry mutation of omnitruncated tilings: 4.8.2n
Symmetry *n42 [n,4]	Spherical		Euclidean	Compact hyperbolic				Paracomp.
Symmetry *n42 [n,4]	*242 [2,4]	*342 [3,4]	*442 [4,4]	*542 [5,4]	*642 [6,4]	*742 [7,4]	*842 [8,4]...	*∞42 [∞,4]
Omnitruncated figure	4.8.4	4.8.6	4.8.8	4.8.10	4.8.12	4.8.14	4.8.16	4.8.∞
Omnitruncated duals	V4.8.4	V4.8.6	V4.8.8	V4.8.10	V4.8.12	V4.8.14	V4.8.16	V4.8.∞

=== Snub tilings ===
4n2 symmetry mutations of snub tilings: 3.3.4.3.n
Symmetry 4n2	Spherical		Euclidean	Compact hyperbolic				Paracomp.
Symmetry 4n2	242	342	442	542	642	742	842	∞42
Snub figures								
Config.	3.3.4.3.2	3.3.4.3.3	3.3.4.3.4	3.3.4.3.5	3.3.4.3.6	3.3.4.3.7	3.3.4.3.8	3.3.4.3.∞
Gyro figures								
Config.	V3.3.4.3.2	V3.3.4.3.3	V3.3.4.3.4	V3.3.4.3.5	V3.3.4.3.6	V3.3.4.3.7	V3.3.4.3.8	V3.3.4.3.∞

== *n52 symmetry ==
=== Regular tilings ===
*n52 symmetry mutation of truncated tilings: 5^{n}
Sphere	Hyperbolic plane					
{5,3}	{5,4}	{5,5}	{5,6}	{5,7}	{5,8}	...{5,∞}

== *n62 symmetry ==
=== Regular tilings ===
*n62 symmetry mutation of regular tilings: {6,n}
Spherical	Euclidean	Hyperbolic tilings						
{6,2}	{6,3}	{6,4}	{6,5}	{6,6}	{6,7}	{6,8}	...	{6,∞}

== *n82 symmetry ==
=== Regular tilings ===
n82 symmetry mutations of regular tilings: 8^{n}
Space	Spherical	Compact hyperbolic						Paracompact
Tiling								
Config.	8.8	8^{3}	8^{4}	8^{5}	8^{6}	8^{7}	8^{8}	...8^{∞}

== Sources ==
- John H. Conway, Heidi Burgiel, Chaim Goodman-Strauss, The Symmetries of Things 2008, ISBN 978-1-56881-220-5
- From hyperbolic 2-space to Euclidean 3-space: Tilings and patterns via topology Stephen Hyde
