= Truncated order-5 square tiling =

Type of tiling in geometry

Truncated order-5 square tiling
Poincaré disk model of the hyperbolic plane
Type	Hyperbolic uniform tiling
Vertex configuration	8.8.5
Schläfli symbol	t{4,5}
Wythoff symbol	2 5 | 4
Coxeter diagram	
Symmetry group	[5,4], (*542)
Dual	Order-4 pentakis pentagonal tiling
Properties	Vertex-transitive

In geometry, the truncated order-5 square tiling is a uniform tiling of the hyperbolic plane. It has Schläfli symbol of t_{0,1}{4,5}.

== Related polyhedra and tiling ==
Uniform pentagonal/square tilings
Symmetry: [5,4], (*542)							[5,4]^{+}, (542)	[5^{+},4], (5*2)	[5,4,1^{+}], (*552)
{5,4}	t{5,4}	r{5,4}	2t{5,4}=t{4,5}	2r{5,4}={4,5}	rr{5,4}	tr{5,4}	sr{5,4}	s{5,4}	h{4,5}
Uniform duals
V5^{4}	V4.10.10	V4.5.4.5	V5.8.8	V4^{5}	V4.4.5.4	V4.8.10	V3.3.4.3.5	V3.3.5.3.5	V5^{5}

*n42 symmetry mutation of truncated tilings: n.8.8
Symmetry *n42 [n,4]	Spherical		Euclidean	Compact hyperbolic				Paracompact
Symmetry *n42 [n,4]	*242 [2,4]	*342 [3,4]	*442 [4,4]	*542 [5,4]	*642 [6,4]	*742 [7,4]	*842 [8,4]...	*∞42 [∞,4]
Truncated figures								
Config.	2.8.8	3.8.8	4.8.8	5.8.8	6.8.8	7.8.8	8.8.8	∞.8.8
n-kis figures								
Config.	V2.8.8	V3.8.8	V4.8.8	V5.8.8	V6.8.8	V7.8.8	V8.8.8	V∞.8.8

== See also ==
- Uniform tilings in hyperbolic plane
- List of regular polytopes
