= Truncated cuboctahedron =

Archimedean solid with 26 faces

Truncated cuboctahedron
(Click here for rotating model)
Type	Archimedean solid Uniform polyhedron
Elements	F = 26, E = 72, V = 48 (χ = 2)
Faces by sides	12{4}+8{6}+6{8}
Conway notation	bC or taC
Schläfli symbols	tr{4,3} or $t\begin{Bmatrix} 4 \\ 3 \end{Bmatrix}$
Schläfli symbols	t_{0,1,2}{4,3}
Wythoff symbol	2 3 4 |
Coxeter diagram	
Symmetry group	O_{h}, B_{3}, [4,3], (*432), order 48
Rotation group	O, [4,3]^{+}, (432), order 24
Dihedral angle	$$\begin{align} \text{4-6:}& \ \arccos\tfrac{-\sqrt 6}{3} = 144^\circ 44'08'' \\[4pt] \text{4-8:}& \ \arccos\tfrac{-1}{\sqrt 2} = 135^\circ \\ \text{6-8:}& \ \arccos\tfrac{-\sqrt 3}{3} = 125^\circ 15'51'' \end{align}$$
References	U_{11}, C_{23}, W_{15}
Properties	Semiregular convex zonohedron
Colored faces	4.6.8 (Vertex figure)
Disdyakis dodecahedron (dual polyhedron)	Net

In geometry, the truncated cuboctahedron or great rhombicuboctahedron is an Archimedean solid, named by Kepler as a truncation of a cuboctahedron. It has 12 square faces, 8 regular hexagonal faces, 6 regular octagonal faces, 48 vertices, and 72 edges. Since each of its faces has point symmetry (equivalently, 180° rotational symmetry), the truncated cuboctahedron is a 9-zonohedron. The truncated cuboctahedron can tessellate with the octagonal prism. It is the cantitruncated form of either a cube or a regular octahedron.

3D model of a truncated cuboctahedron

== Names ==
The name truncated cuboctahedron, given originally by Johannes Kepler, is misleading: an actual truncation of a cuboctahedron has rectangles instead of squares; however, this nonuniform polyhedron is topologically equivalent to the Archimedean solid unrigorously named truncated cuboctahedron.

Alternate interchangeable names are:

- Truncated cuboctahedron (Johannes Kepler),
- Rhombitruncated cuboctahedron (Magnus Wenninger),
- Great rhombicuboctahedron (Robert Williams),
- Great rhombcuboctahedron (Peter Cromwell),
- Omnitruncated cube or cantitruncated cube (Norman Johnson),
- Beveled cube (Conway polyhedron notation).
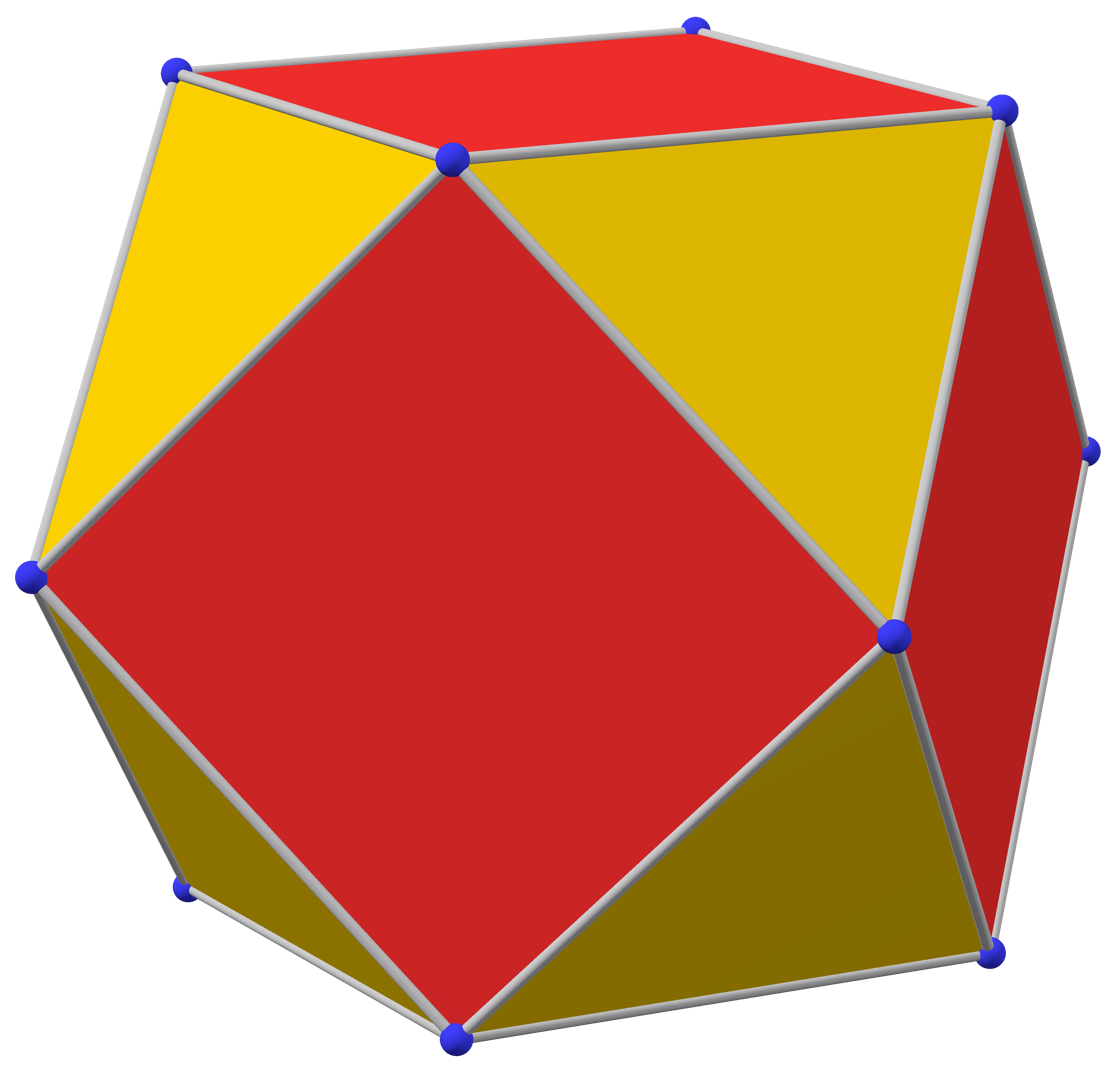
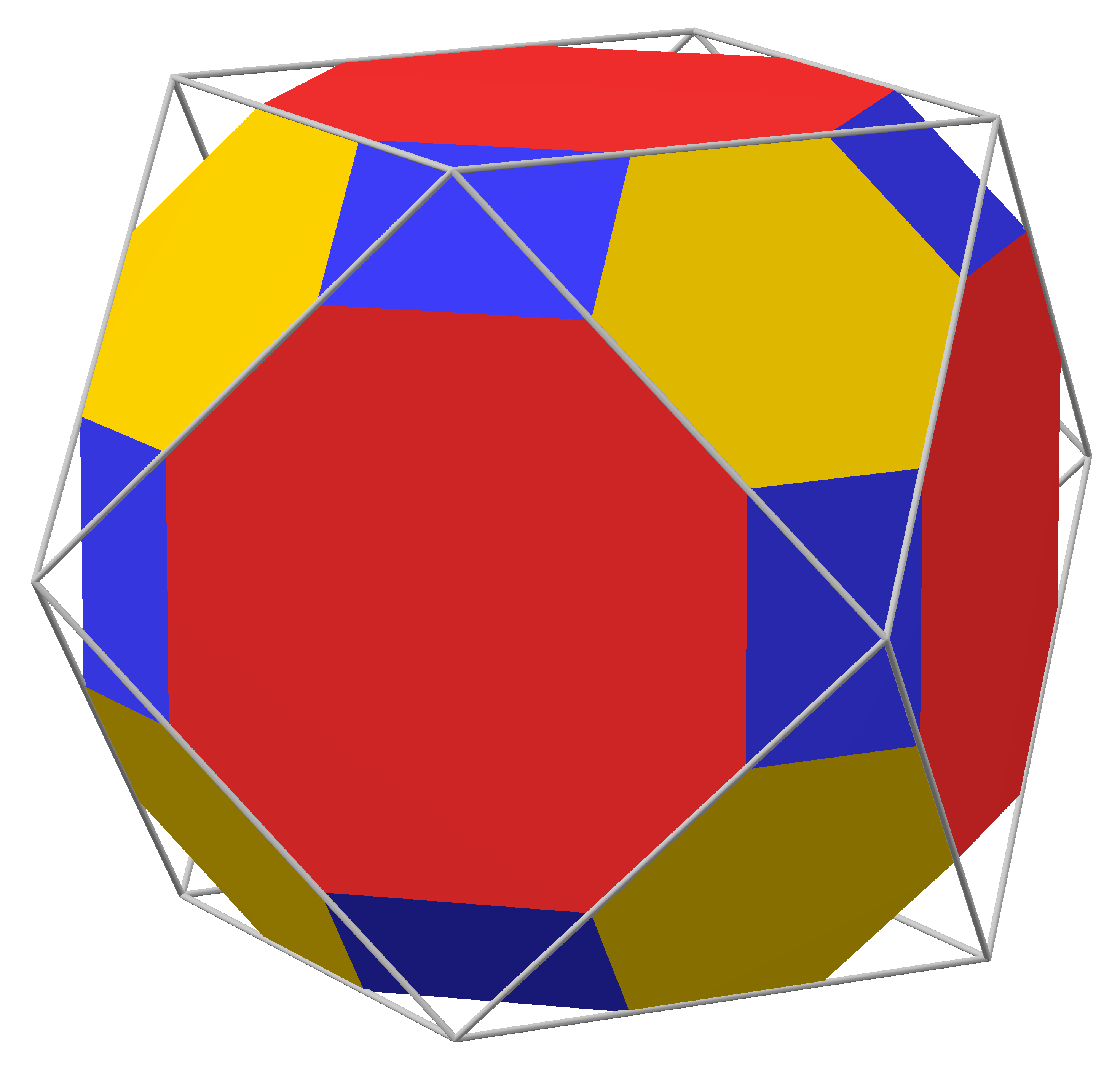
Cuboctahedron and its truncation

Cantitruncation of a cube (left) and a regular octahedron (right) into a truncated cuboctahedron

There is a nonconvex uniform polyhedron with a similar name: the nonconvex great rhombicuboctahedron.

== Cartesian coordinates ==
The Cartesian coordinates for the vertices of a truncated cuboctahedron having edge length 2 and centered at the origin are all the permutations of:
$$\Bigl(\pm 1, \quad \pm\left(1 + \sqrt 2\right), \quad \pm\left(1 + 2\sqrt 2\right) \Bigr).$$

== Area and volume ==
The area A and the volume V of the truncated cuboctahedron of edge length a are:

$$\begin{align}
A &= 12\left(2+\sqrt{2}+\sqrt{3}\right) a^2 &&\approx 61.755\,1724~a^2, \\
V &= \left(22+14\sqrt{2}\right) a^3 &&\approx 41.798\,9899~a^3. \end{align}$$

== Dissection ==
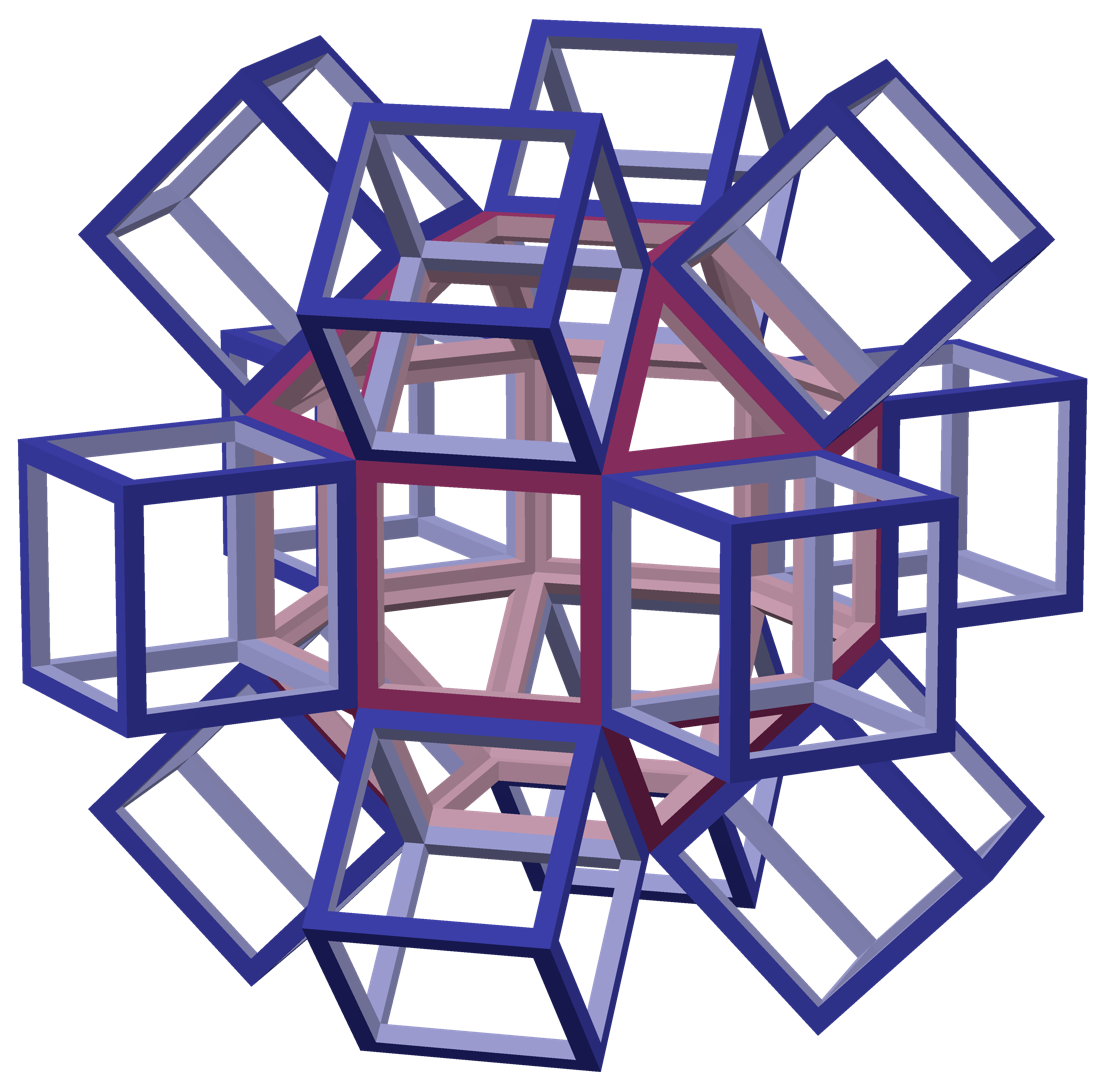
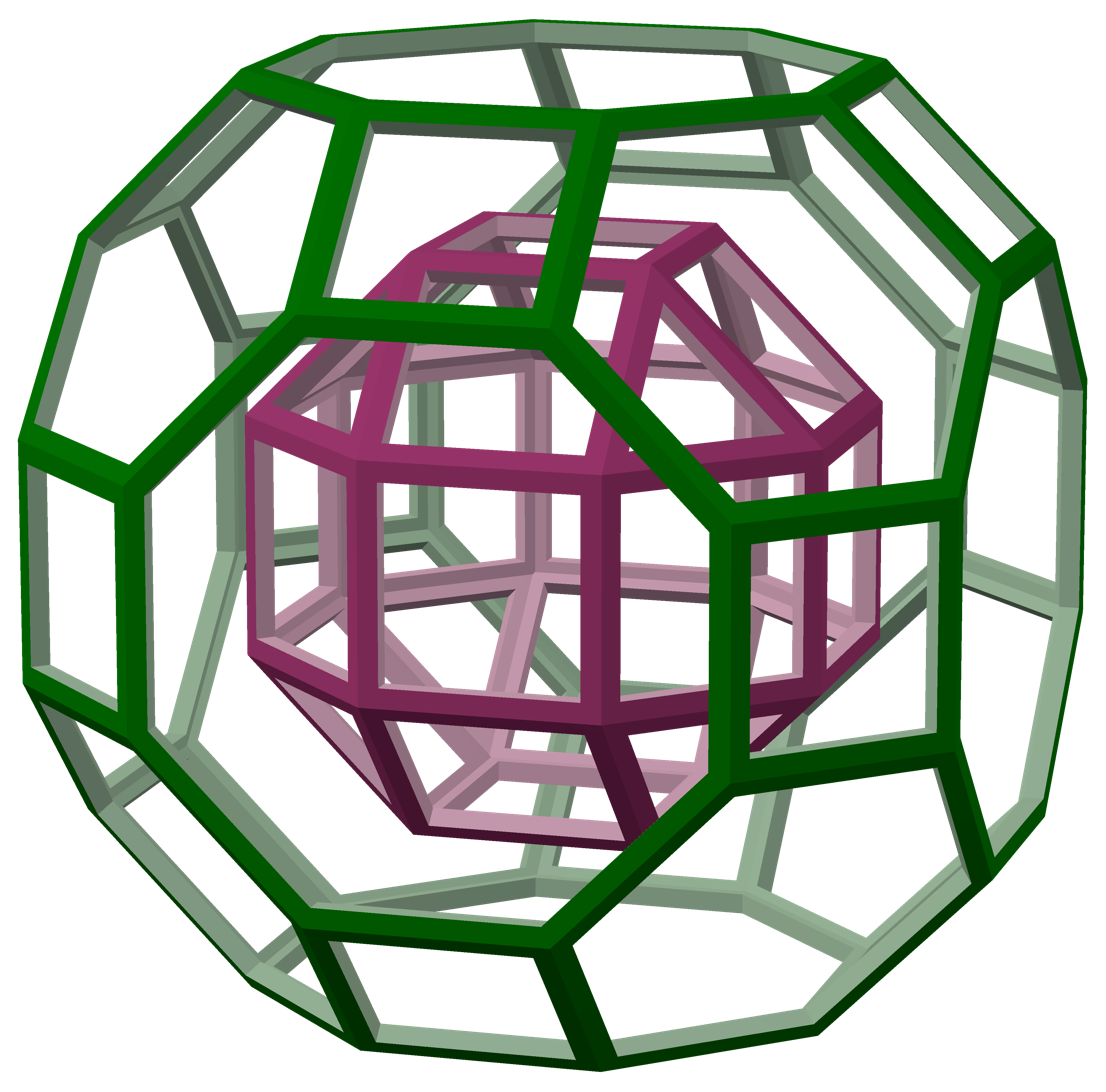

The truncated cuboctahedron is the convex hull of a rhombicuboctahedron with cubes above its 12 squares on 2-fold symmetry axes. The rest of its space can be dissected into 6 square cupolas below the octagons, and 8 triangular cupolas below the hexagons.

A dissected truncated cuboctahedron can create a genus 5, 7, or 11 Stewart toroid by removing the central rhombicuboctahedron, and either the 6 square cupolas, the 8 triangular cupolas, or the 12 cubes respectively. Many other lower symmetry toroids can also be constructed by removing the central rhombicuboctahedron, and a subset of the other dissection components. For example, removing 4 of the triangular cupolas creates a genus 3 toroid; if these cupolas are appropriately chosen, then this toroid has tetrahedral symmetry.

Stewart toroids
Genus 3	Genus 5	Genus 7	Genus 11

== Uniform colorings ==
There is only one uniform coloring of the faces of this polyhedron, one color for each face type.

A 2-uniform coloring, with tetrahedral symmetry, exists with alternately colored hexagons.

== Orthogonal projections ==
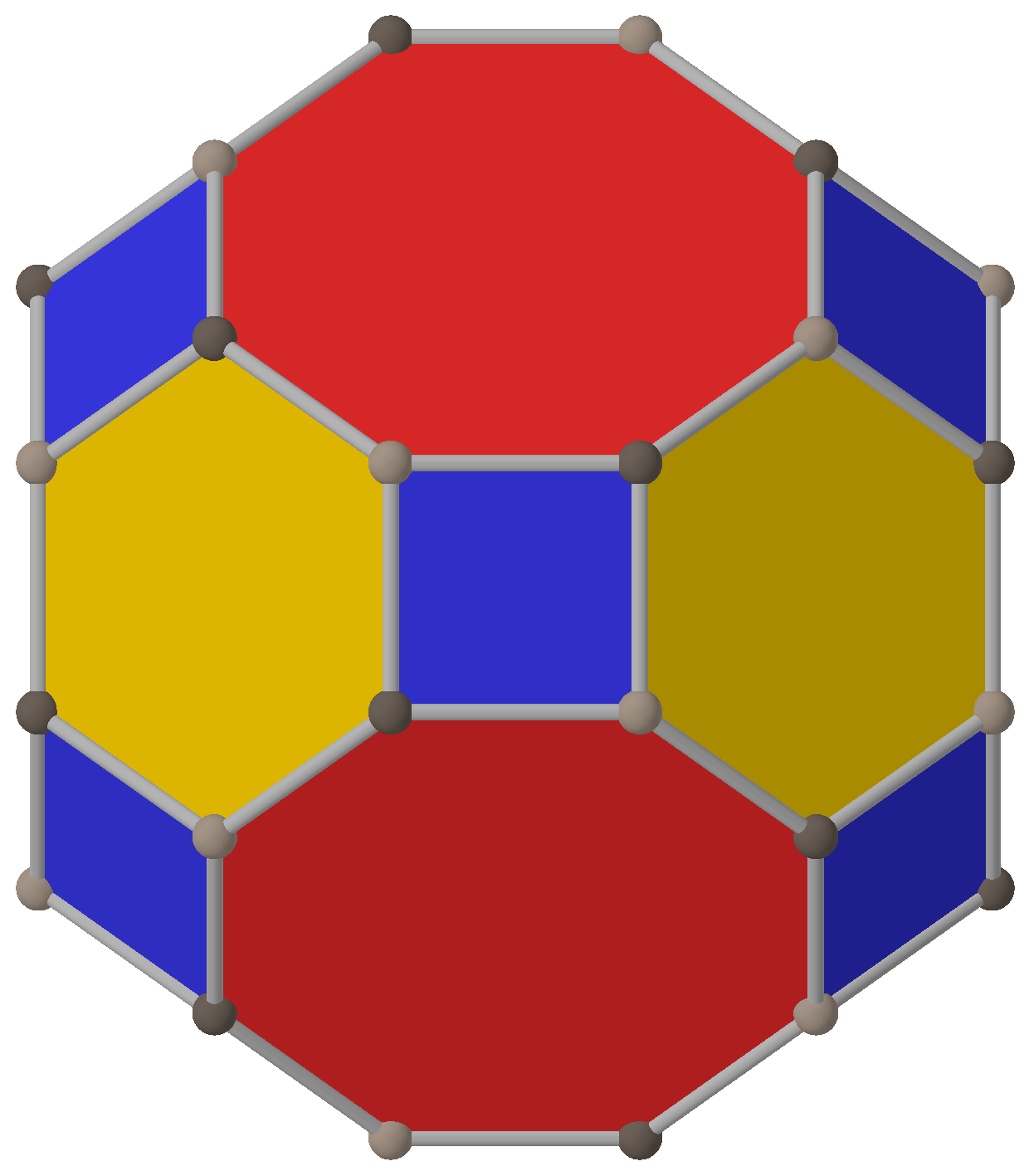
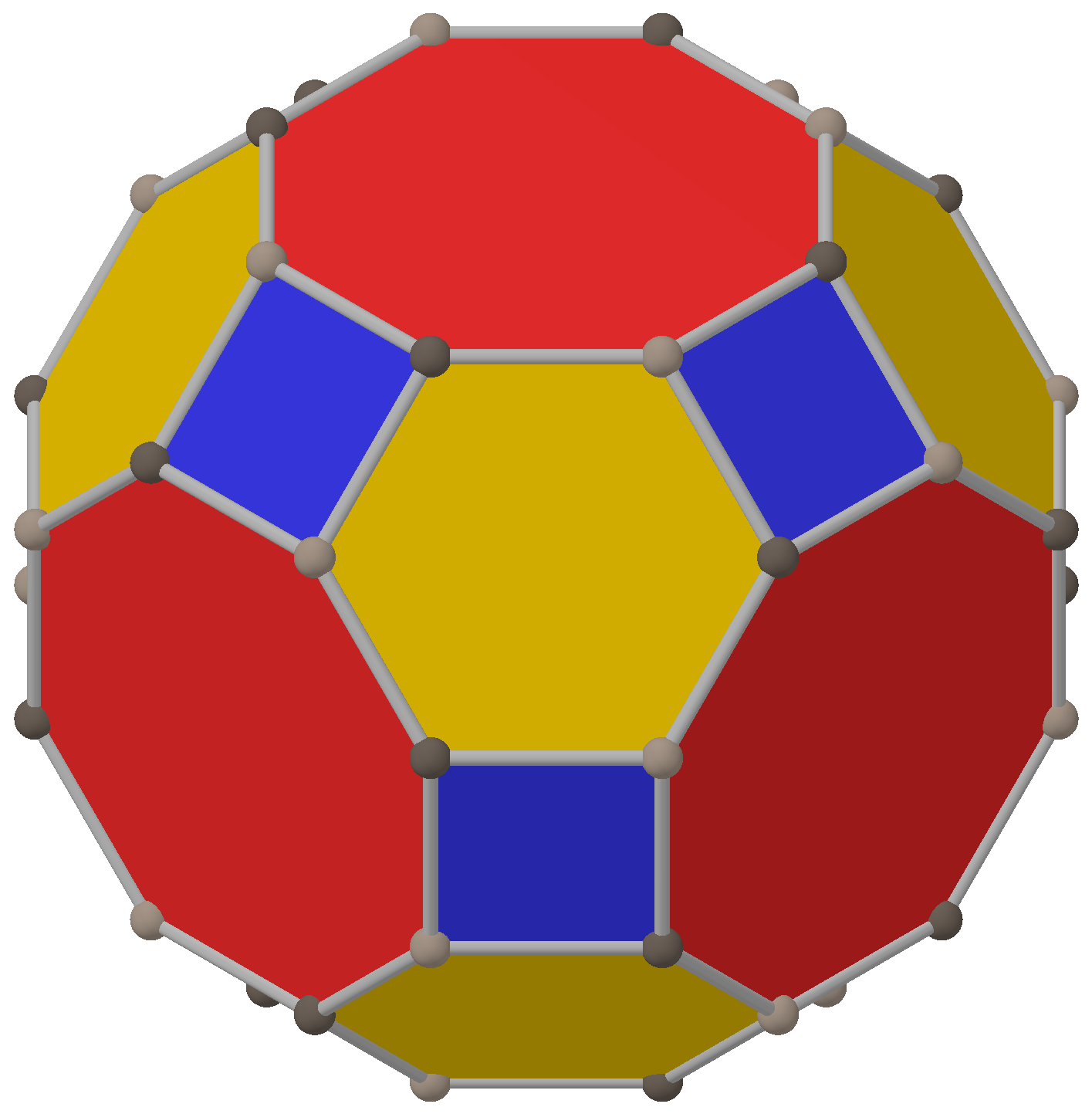
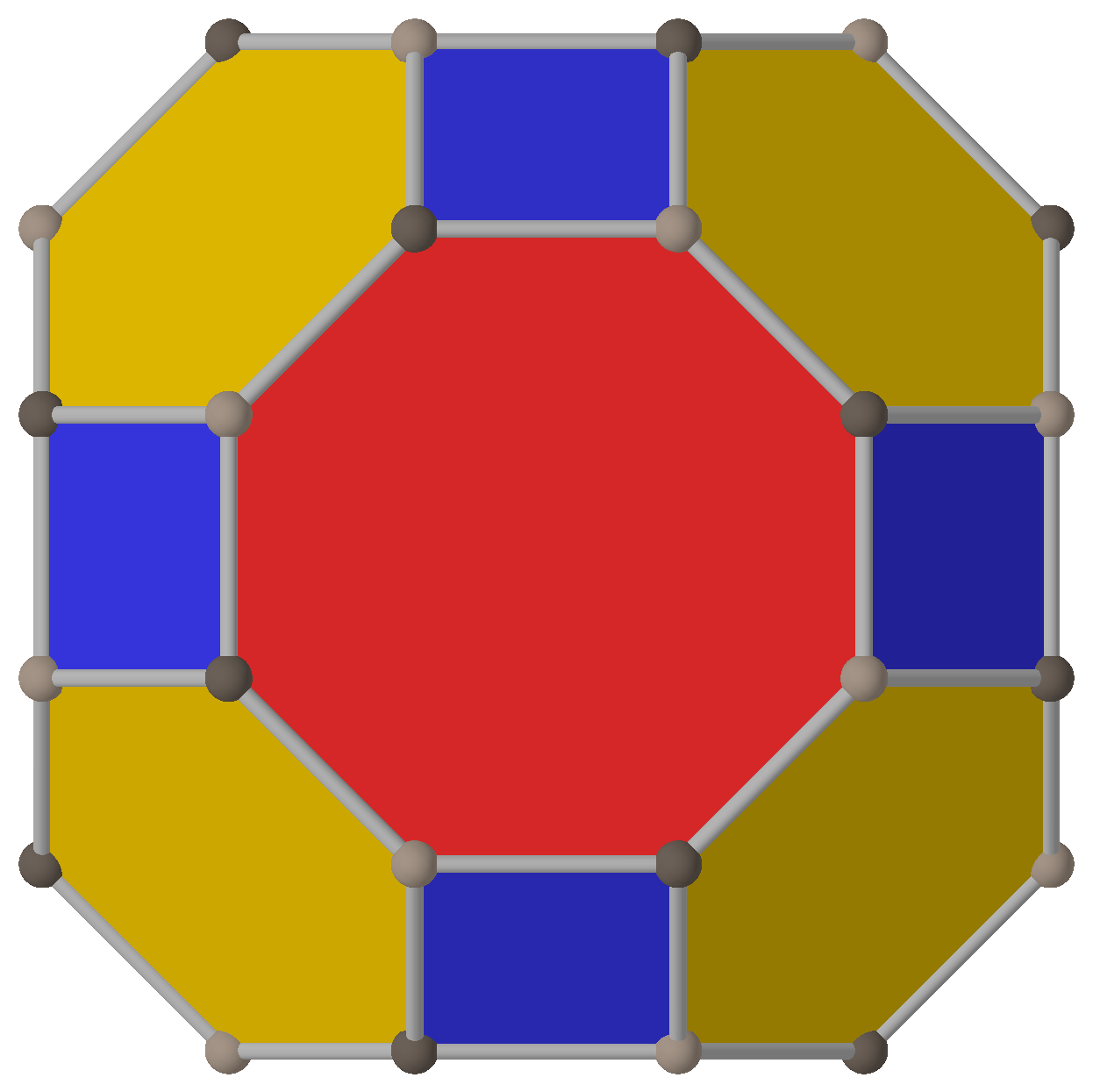

The truncated cuboctahedron has two special orthogonal projections in the A_{2} and B_{2} Coxeter planes with [6] and [8] projective symmetry, and numerous [2] symmetries can be constructed from various projected planes relative to the polyhedron elements.

Orthogonal projections
Centered by	Vertex	Edge 4-6	Edge 4-8	Edge 6-8	Face normal 4-6
Image					
Projective symmetry	[2]^{+}	[2]	[2]	[2]	[2]
Centered by	Face normal Square	Face normal Octagon	Face Square	Face Hexagon	Face Octagon
Image					
Projective symmetry	[2]	[2]	[2]	[6]	[4]

== Spherical tiling ==
The truncated cuboctahedron can also be represented as a spherical tiling, and projected onto the plane via a stereographic projection. This projection is conformal, preserving angles but not areas or lengths. Straight lines on the sphere are projected as circular arcs on the plane.

Orthogonal projection	square-centered	hexagon-centered	octagon-centered
Orthogonal projection	Stereographic projections		

== Full octahedral group ==
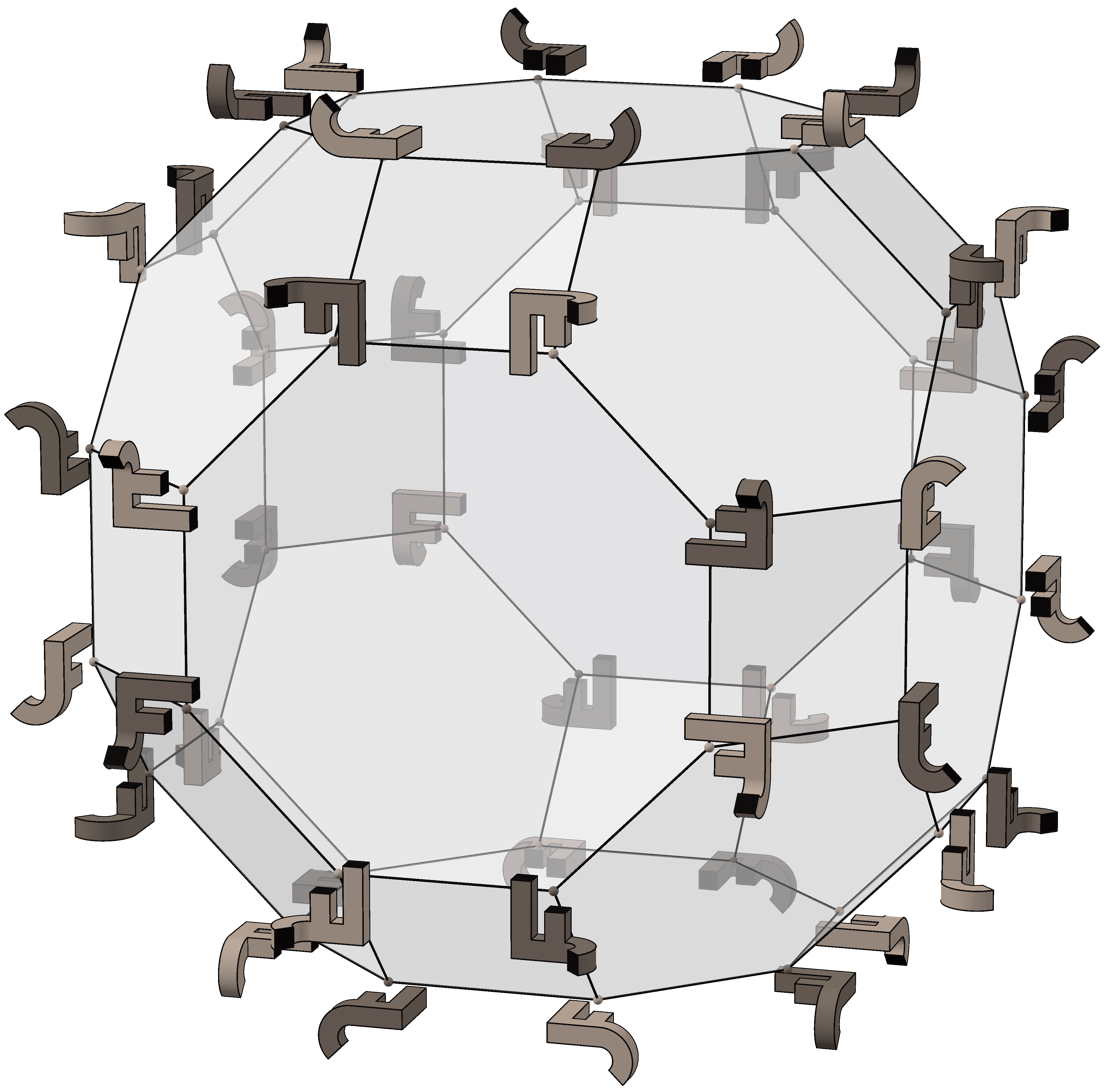

Like many other solids the truncated octahedron has full octahedral symmetry - but its relationship with the full octahedral group is closer than that: Its 48 vertices correspond to the elements of the group, and each face of its dual is a fundamental domain of the group.

The image on the right shows the 48 permutations in the group applied to an example object (namely the light JF compound on the left). The 24 light elements are rotations, and the dark ones are their reflections.

The edges of the solid correspond to the 9 reflections in the group:

- Those between octagons and squares correspond to the 3 reflections between opposite octagons.
- Hexagon edges correspond to the 6 reflections between opposite squares.
- (There are no reflections between opposite hexagons.)

The subgroups correspond to solids that share the respective vertices of the truncated octahedron.
E.g. the 3 subgroups with 24 elements correspond to a nonuniform snub cube with chiral octahedral symmetry, a nonuniform rhombicuboctahedron with pyritohedral symmetry (the cantic snub octahedron) and a nonuniform truncated octahedron with full tetrahedral symmetry. The unique subgroup with 12 elements is the alternating group A_{4}. It corresponds to a nonuniform icosahedron with chiral tetrahedral symmetry.

Subgroups and corresponding solids
Truncated cuboctahedron tr{4,3}	Snub cube sr{4,3}	Rhombicuboctahedron s_{2}{3,4}	Truncated octahedron h_{1,2}{4,3}	Icosahedron
[4,3] Full octahedral	[4,3]^{+} Chiral octahedral	[4,3^{+}] Pyritohedral	[1^{+},4,3] = [3,3] Full tetrahedral	[1^{+},4,3^{+}] = [3,3]^{+} Chiral tetrahedral
all 48 vertices	24 vertices			12 vertices

== Related polyhedra ==
Bowtie tetrahedron and cube contain two trapezoidal faces in place of each square.

The truncated cuboctahedron is one of a family of uniform polyhedra related to the cube and regular octahedron.

Uniform octahedral polyhedra
Symmetry: [4,3], (*432)							[4,3]^{+} (432)	[1^{+},4,3] = [3,3] (*332)		[3^{+},4] (3*2)
{4,3}	t{4,3}	r{4,3} r{3^{1,1}}	t{3,4} t{3^{1,1}}	{3,4} {3^{1,1}}	rr{4,3} s_{2}{3,4}	tr{4,3}	sr{4,3}	h{4,3} {3,3}	h_{2}{4,3} t{3,3}	s{3,4} s{3^{1,1}}
		=	=	=				= or	= or	=
Duals to uniform polyhedra
V4^{3}	V3.8^{2}	V(3.4)^{2}	V4.6^{2}	V3^{4}	V3.4^{3}	V4.6.8	V3^{4}.4	V3^{3}	V3.6^{2}	V3^{5}

This polyhedron can be considered a member of a sequence of uniform patterns with vertex configuration (4.6.2p) and Coxeter-Dynkin diagram. For p < 6, the members of the sequence are omnitruncated polyhedra (zonohedrons), shown below as spherical tilings. For p < 6, they are tilings of the hyperbolic plane, starting with the truncated triheptagonal tiling.

*n32 symmetry mutation of omnitruncated tilings: 4.6.2n
Sym. *n32 [n,3]	Spherical				Euclid.	Compact hyperb.		Paraco.	Noncompact hyperbolic			
Sym. *n32 [n,3]	*232 [2,3]	*332 [3,3]	*432 [4,3]	*532 [5,3]	*632 [6,3]	*732 [7,3]	*832 [8,3]	*∞32 [∞,3]	[12i,3]	[9i,3]	[6i,3]	[3i,3]
Figures												
Config.	4.6.4	4.6.6	4.6.8	4.6.10	4.6.12	4.6.14	4.6.16	4.6.∞	4.6.24i	4.6.18i	4.6.12i	4.6.6i
Duals												
Config.	V4.6.4	V4.6.6	V4.6.8	V4.6.10	V4.6.12	V4.6.14	V4.6.16	V4.6.∞	V4.6.24i	V4.6.18i	V4.6.12i	V4.6.6i

*n42 symmetry mutation of omnitruncated tilings: 4.8.2n
Symmetry *n42 [n,4]	Spherical		Euclidean	Compact hyperbolic				Paracomp.
Symmetry *n42 [n,4]	*242 [2,4]	*342 [3,4]	*442 [4,4]	*542 [5,4]	*642 [6,4]	*742 [7,4]	*842 [8,4]...	*∞42 [∞,4]
Omnitruncated figure	4.8.4	4.8.6	4.8.8	4.8.10	4.8.12	4.8.14	4.8.16	4.8.∞
Omnitruncated duals	V4.8.4	V4.8.6	V4.8.8	V4.8.10	V4.8.12	V4.8.14	V4.8.16	V4.8.∞

*n32 symmetry mutation of omnitruncated tilings: 6.8.2n
Sym. *n43 [(n,4,3)]	Spherical	Compact hyperbolic						Paraco.
Sym. *n43 [(n,4,3)]	*243 [4,3]	*343 [(3,4,3)]	*443 [(4,4,3)]	*543 [(5,4,3)]	*643 [(6,4,3)]	*743 [(7,4,3)]	*843 [(8,4,3)]	*∞43 [(∞,4,3)]
Figures								
Config.	4.8.6	6.8.6	8.8.6	10.8.6	12.8.6	14.8.6	16.8.6	∞.8.6
Duals								
Config.	V4.8.6	V6.8.6	V8.8.6	V10.8.6	V12.8.6	V14.8.6	V16.8.6	V6.8.∞

It is first in a series of cantitruncated hypercubes:

Petrie polygon projections
Truncated cuboctahedron	Cantitruncated tesseract	Cantitruncated 5-cube	Cantitruncated 6-cube	Cantitruncated 7-cube	Cantitruncated 8-cube

== Truncated cuboctahedral graph ==
Truncated cuboctahedral graph
- 4-fold symmetry
- Vertices: 48
- Edges: 72
- Automorphisms: 48
- Chromatic number: 2
- Properties: Cubic, Hamiltonian, regular, zero-symmetric

In the mathematical field of graph theory, a truncated cuboctahedral graph (or great rhombcuboctahedral graph) is the graph of vertices and edges of the truncated cuboctahedron, one of the Archimedean solids. It has 48 vertices and 72 edges, and is a zero-symmetric and cubic Archimedean graph.

== See also ==
- Cube
- Cuboctahedron
- Octahedron
- Truncated icosidodecahedron
- Truncated octahedron – truncated tetratetrahedron
- Snub cube
