= Truncated tetrapentagonal tiling =

Uniform tiling of the hyperbolic plane

Truncated tetrapentagonal tiling
Poincaré disk model of the hyperbolic plane
Type	Hyperbolic uniform tiling
Vertex configuration	4.8.10
Schläfli symbol	tr{5,4} or $t\begin{Bmatrix} 5 \\ 4 \end{Bmatrix}$
Wythoff symbol	2 5 4 |
Coxeter diagram	or
Symmetry group	[5,4], (*542)
Dual	Order-4-5 kisrhombille tiling
Properties	Vertex-transitive

In geometry, the truncated tetrapentagonal tiling is a uniform tiling of the hyperbolic plane. It has Schläfli symbol of t_{0,1,2}{4,5} or tr{4,5}.

== Symmetry ==
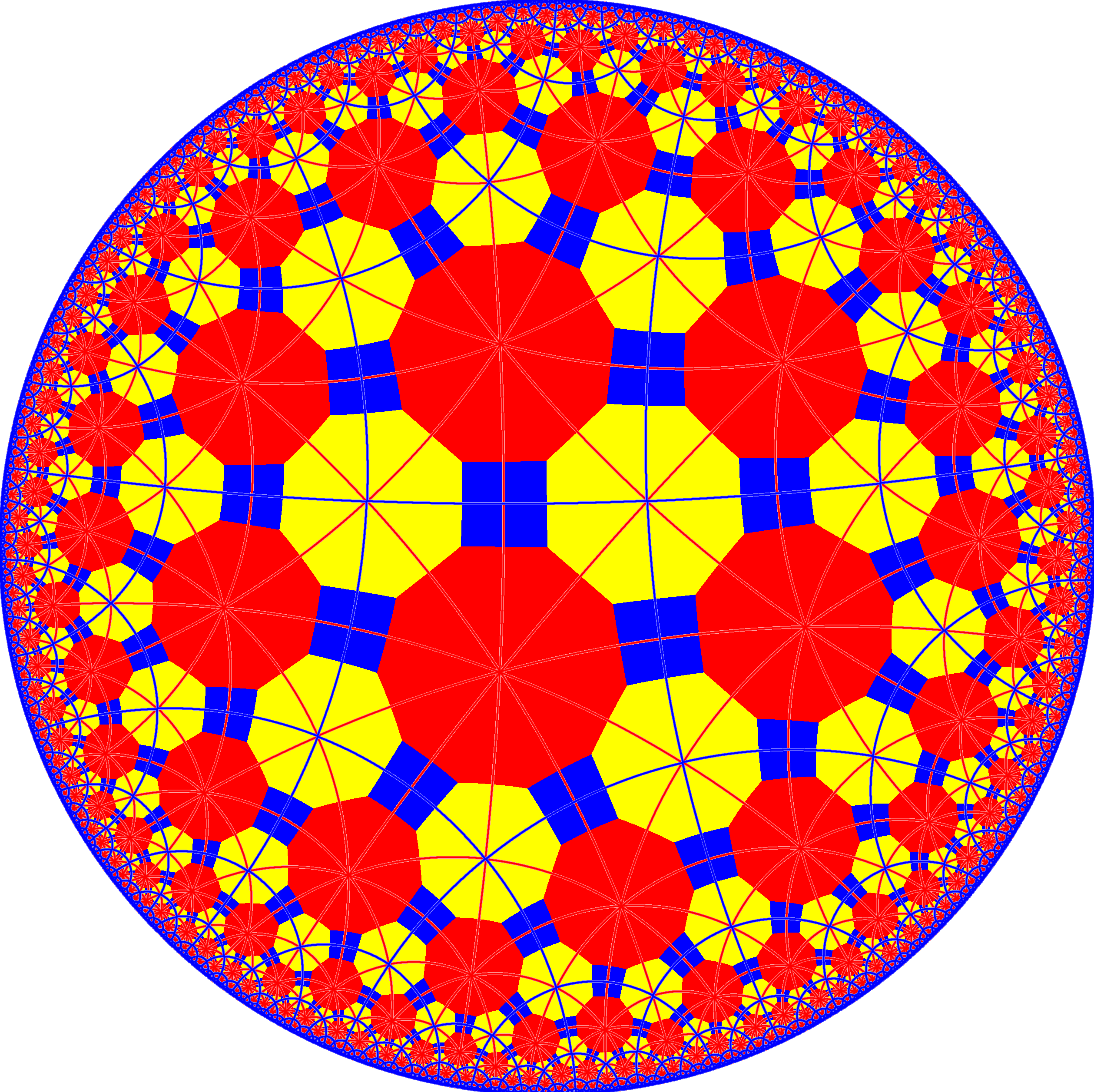
Truncated tetrapentagonal tiling with mirror lines.

There are four small index subgroup constructed from [5,4] by mirror removal and alternation. In these images fundamental domains are alternately colored black and white, and mirrors exist on the boundaries between colors.

A radical subgroup is constructed [5*,4], index 10, as [5^{+},4], (5*2) with gyration points removed, becoming orbifold (*22222), and its direct subgroup [5*,4]^{+}, index 20, becomes orbifold (22222).

Small index subgroups of [5,4]
Index	1	2		10
Diagram				
Coxeter (orbifold)	[5,4] = (*542)	[5,4,1^{+}] = = (*552)	[5^{+},4] = (5*2)	[5*,4] = (*22222)
Direct subgroups
Index	2	4		20
Diagram				
Coxeter (orbifold)	[5,4]^{+} = (542)	[5^{+},4]^{+} = = (552)		[5*,4]^{+} = (22222)

== Related polyhedra and tiling ==
*n42 symmetry mutation of omnitruncated tilings: 4.8.2n
Symmetry *n42 [n,4]	Spherical		Euclidean	Compact hyperbolic				Paracomp.
Symmetry *n42 [n,4]	*242 [2,4]	*342 [3,4]	*442 [4,4]	*542 [5,4]	*642 [6,4]	*742 [7,4]	*842 [8,4]...	*∞42 [∞,4]
Omnitruncated figure	4.8.4	4.8.6	4.8.8	4.8.10	4.8.12	4.8.14	4.8.16	4.8.∞
Omnitruncated duals	V4.8.4	V4.8.6	V4.8.8	V4.8.10	V4.8.12	V4.8.14	V4.8.16	V4.8.∞

*nn2 symmetry mutations of omnitruncated tilings: 4.2n.2n
Symmetry *nn2 [n,n]	Spherical		Euclidean	Compact hyperbolic				Paracomp.
Symmetry *nn2 [n,n]	*222 [2,2]	*332 [3,3]	*442 [4,4]	*552 [5,5]	*662 [6,6]	*772 [7,7]	*882 [8,8]...	*∞∞2 [∞,∞]
Figure								
Config.	4.4.4	4.6.6	4.8.8	4.10.10	4.12.12	4.14.14	4.16.16	4.∞.∞
Dual								
Config.	V4.4.4	V4.6.6	V4.8.8	V4.10.10	V4.12.12	V4.14.14	V4.16.16	V4.∞.∞

Uniform pentagonal/square tilings
Symmetry: [5,4], (*542)							[5,4]^{+}, (542)	[5^{+},4], (5*2)	[5,4,1^{+}], (*552)
{5,4}	t{5,4}	r{5,4}	2t{5,4}=t{4,5}	2r{5,4}={4,5}	rr{5,4}	tr{5,4}	sr{5,4}	s{5,4}	h{4,5}
Uniform duals
V5^{4}	V4.10.10	V4.5.4.5	V5.8.8	V4^{5}	V4.4.5.4	V4.8.10	V3.3.4.3.5	V3.3.5.3.5	V5^{5}

== See also ==
- Uniform tilings in hyperbolic plane
- List of regular polytopes
