= Snub pentapentagonal tiling =

Uniform tiling of the hyperbolic plane

Snub pentapentagonal tiling
Poincaré disk model of the hyperbolic plane
| Type | Hyperbolic uniform tiling |
| Vertex configuration | 3.3.5.3.5 |
| Schläfli symbol | s{5,4} sr{5,5} |
| Wythoff symbol | | 5 5 2 |
| Coxeter diagram | or |
| Symmetry group | [5^{+},4], (5*2) [5,5]^{+}, (552) |
| Dual | Order-5-5 floret pentagonal tiling |
| Properties | Vertex-transitive |

In geometry, the snub pentapentagonal tiling is a uniform tiling of the hyperbolic plane. It has Schläfli symbol of sr{5,5}, constructed from two regular pentagons and three equilateral triangles around every vertex.

== Images ==
Drawn in chiral pairs, with edges missing between black triangles:

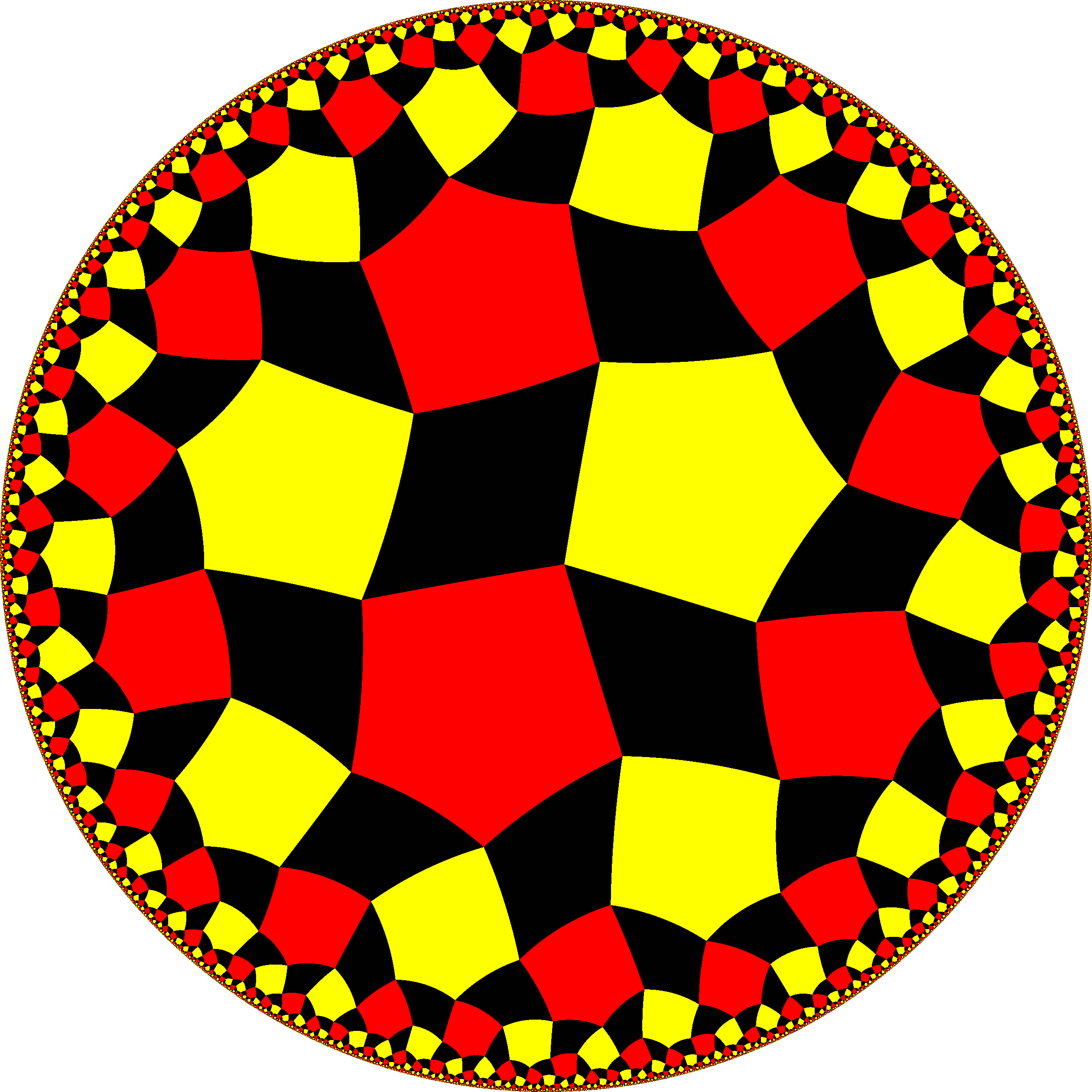
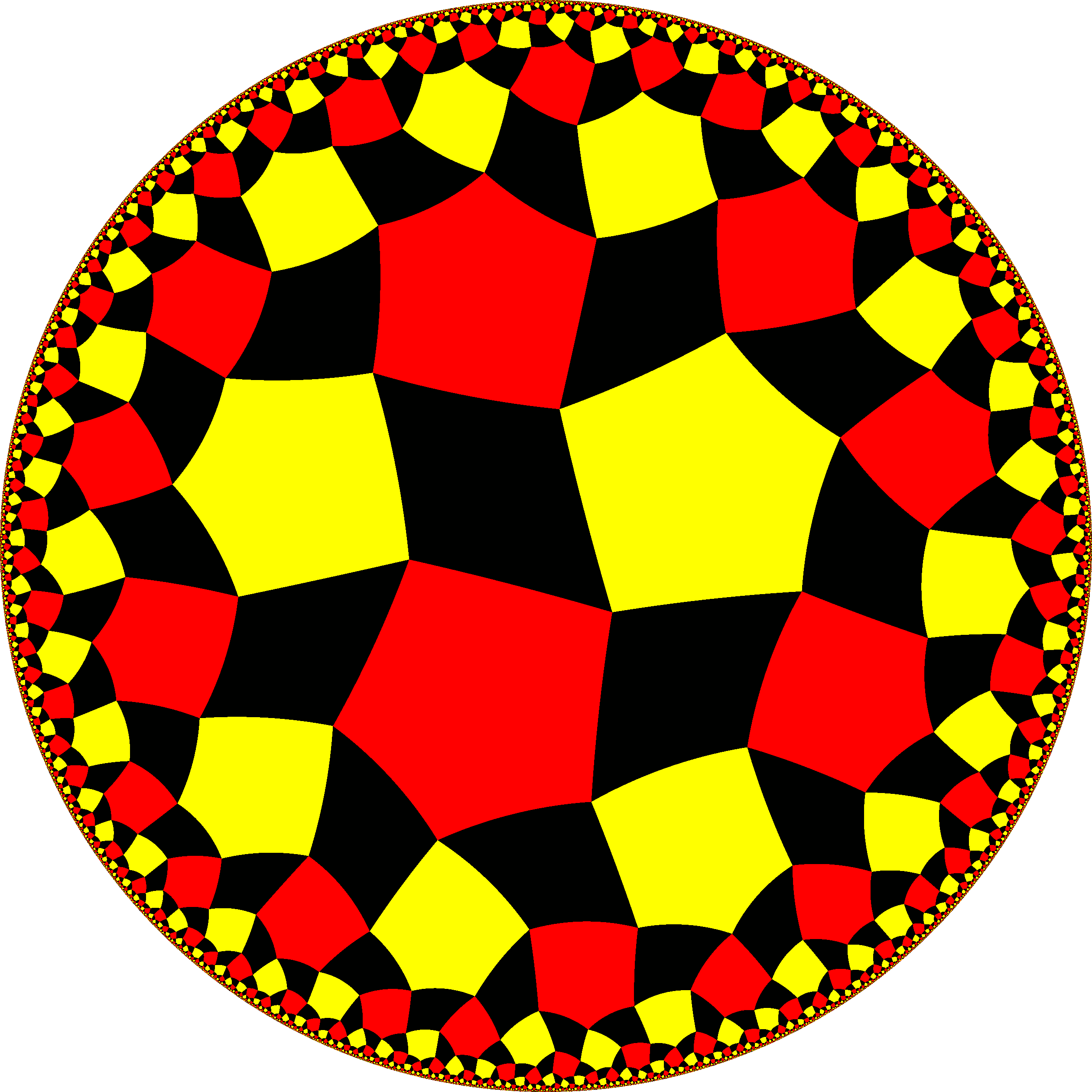

== Symmetry ==
A double symmetry coloring can be constructed from [5,4] symmetry with only one color pentagon. It has Schläfli symbol s{5,4}, and Coxeter diagram.

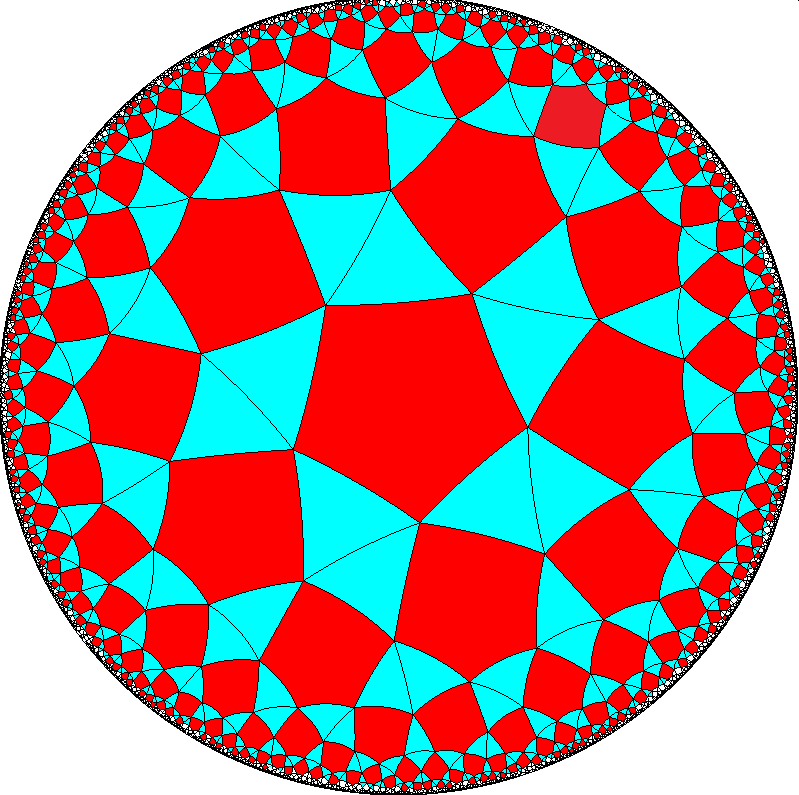

== Related tilings ==
Uniform pentapentagonal tilings
| Symmetry: [5,5], (*552) | | | | | | | [5,5]^{+}, (552) |
|---|---|---|---|---|---|---|---|
| = | = | = | = | = | = | = | = |
| Order-5 pentagonal tiling {5,5} | Truncated order-5 pentagonal tiling t{5,5} | Order-4 pentagonal tiling r{5,5} | Truncated order-5 pentagonal tiling 2t{5,5} = t{5,5} | Order-5 pentagonal tiling 2r{5,5} = {5,5} | Tetrapentagonal tiling rr{5,5} | Truncated order-4 pentagonal tiling tr{5,5} | Snub pentapentagonal tiling sr{5,5} |
Uniform duals
| Order-5 pentagonal tiling V5.5.5.5.5 | V5.10.10 | Order-5 square tiling V5.5.5.5 | V5.10.10 | Order-5 pentagonal tiling V5.5.5.5.5 | V4.5.4.5 | V4.10.10 | V3.3.5.3.5 |

Uniform pentagonal/square tilings
| Symmetry: [5,4], (*542) | | | | | | | [5,4]^{+}, (542) | [5^{+},4], (5*2) | [5,4,1^{+}], (*552) |
|---|---|---|---|---|---|---|---|---|---|
| {5,4} | t{5,4} | r{5,4} | 2t{5,4}=t{4,5} | 2r{5,4}={4,5} | rr{5,4} | tr{5,4} | sr{5,4} | s{5,4} | h{4,5} |
Uniform duals
| V5^{4} | V4.10.10 | V4.5.4.5 | V5.8.8 | V4^{5} | V4.4.5.4 | V4.8.10 | V3.3.4.3.5 | V3.3.5.3.5 | V5^{5} |

4n2 symmetry mutations of snub tilings: 3.3.n.3.n
| Symmetry 4n2 | Spherical | | Euclidean | Compact hyperbolic | | | | Paracompact |
| Symmetry 4n2 | 222 | 322 | 442 | 552 | 662 | 772 | 882 | ∞∞2 |
|---|---|---|---|---|---|---|---|---|
| Snub figures | | | | | | | | |
| Config. | 3.3.2.3.2 | 3.3.3.3.3 | 3.3.4.3.4 | 3.3.5.3.5 | 3.3.6.3.6 | 3.3.7.3.7 | 3.3.8.3.8 | 3.3.∞.3.∞ |
| Gyro figures | | | | | | | | |
| Config. | V3.3.2.3.2 | V3.3.3.3.3 | V3.3.4.3.4 | V3.3.5.3.5 | V3.3.6.3.6 | V3.3.7.3.7 | V3.3.8.3.8 | V3.3.∞.3.∞ |

== See also ==
- Square tiling
- Uniform tilings in hyperbolic plane
- List of regular polytopes
