= Kisrhombille =

Mathematical tiling

Euclidean kisrhombille tiling

In geometry, a kisrhombille is a uniform tiling of rhombic faces, divided by central points into four triangles.

Examples:

- 3-6 kisrhombille – Euclidean plane
- 3-7 kisrhombille – hyperbolic plane
- 3-8 kisrhombille – hyperbolic plane
- 4-5 kisrhombille – hyperbolic plane
