= Snub tetrapentagonal tiling =

Uniform tiling of the hyperbolic plane

In geometry, the snub tetrapentagonal tiling is a uniform tiling of the hyperbolic plane. It has Schläfli symbol of sr{5,4}.

Snub tetrapentagonal tiling
Poincaré disk model of the hyperbolic plane
Type	Hyperbolic uniform tiling
Vertex configuration	3.3.4.3.5
Schläfli symbol	sr{5,4} or $s\begin{Bmatrix} 5 \\ 4 \end{Bmatrix}$
Wythoff symbol	| 5 4 2
Coxeter diagram	or
Symmetry group	[5,4]^{+}, (542)
Dual	Order-5-4 floret pentagonal tiling
Properties	Vertex-transitive Chiral

== Images ==
Drawn in chiral pairs, with edges missing between black triangles:

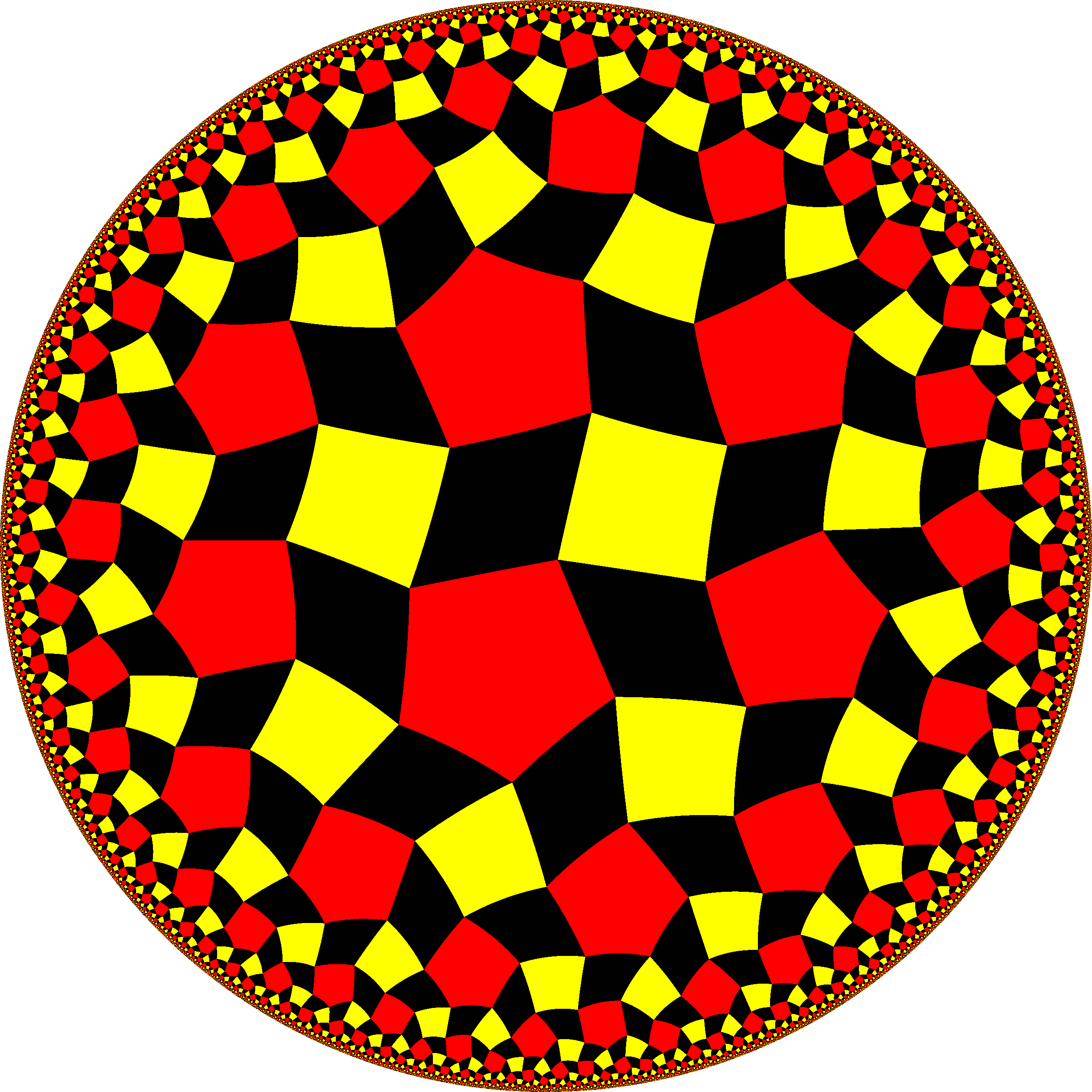
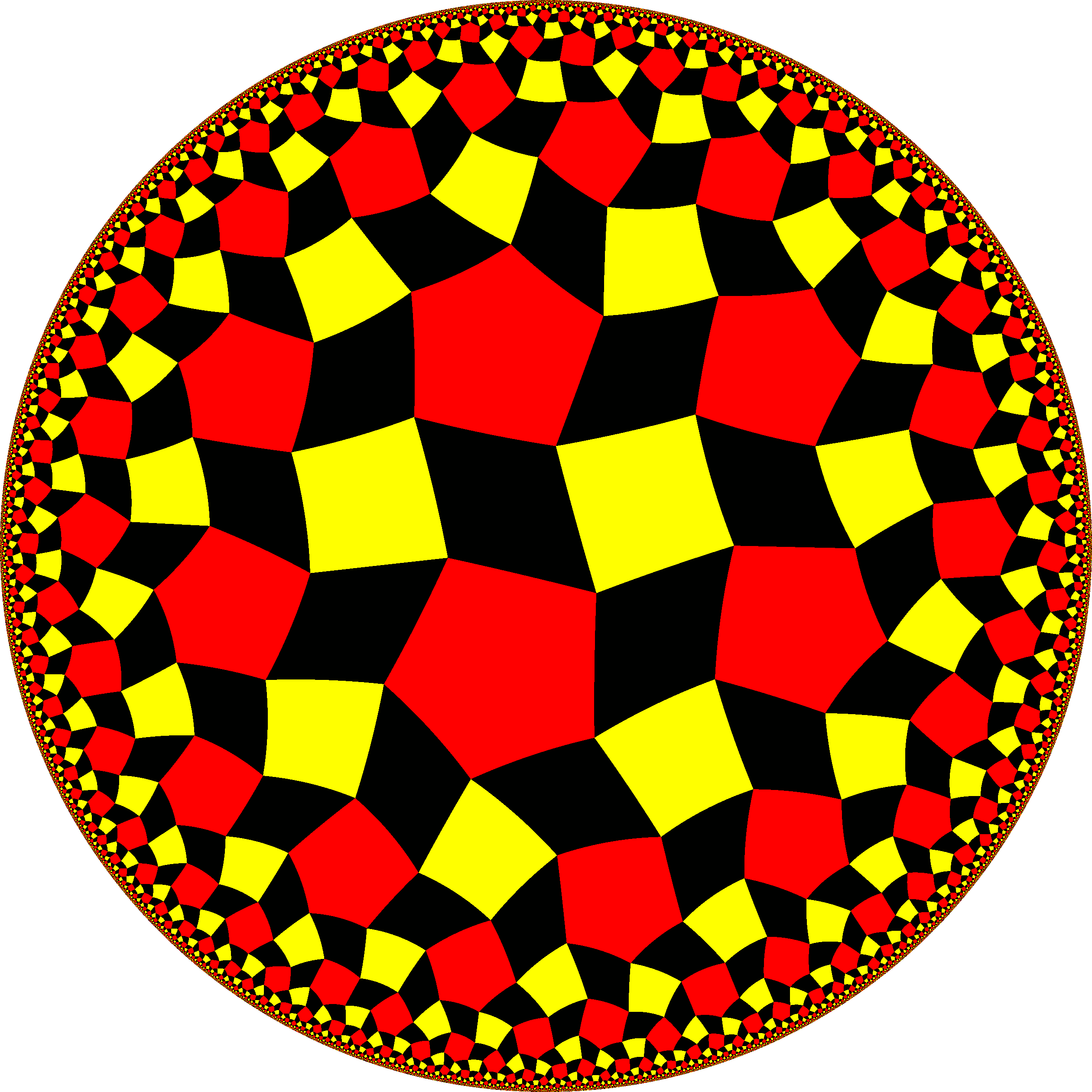

== Dual tiling ==
The dual is called an order-5-4 floret pentagonal tiling, defined by face configuration V3.3.4.3.5.

== Related polyhedra and tiling ==
The snub tetrapentagonal tiling is fourth in a series of snub polyhedra and tilings with vertex figure 3.3.4.3.n.

4n2 symmetry mutations of snub tilings: 3.3.4.3.n
Symmetry 4n2	Spherical		Euclidean	Compact hyperbolic				Paracomp.
Symmetry 4n2	242	342	442	542	642	742	842	∞42
Snub figures								
Config.	3.3.4.3.2	3.3.4.3.3	3.3.4.3.4	3.3.4.3.5	3.3.4.3.6	3.3.4.3.7	3.3.4.3.8	3.3.4.3.∞
Gyro figures								
Config.	V3.3.4.3.2	V3.3.4.3.3	V3.3.4.3.4	V3.3.4.3.5	V3.3.4.3.6	V3.3.4.3.7	V3.3.4.3.8	V3.3.4.3.∞

Uniform pentagonal/square tilings
Symmetry: [5,4], (*542)							[5,4]^{+}, (542)	[5^{+},4], (5*2)	[5,4,1^{+}], (*552)
{5,4}	t{5,4}	r{5,4}	2t{5,4}=t{4,5}	2r{5,4}={4,5}	rr{5,4}	tr{5,4}	sr{5,4}	s{5,4}	h{4,5}
Uniform duals
V5^{4}	V4.10.10	V4.5.4.5	V5.8.8	V4^{5}	V4.4.5.4	V4.8.10	V3.3.4.3.5	V3.3.5.3.5	V5^{5}

== See also ==
- Square tiling
- Tilings of regular polygons
- List of uniform planar tilings
- List of regular polytopes
