= Truncated order-4 pentagonal tiling =

Uniform tiling of the hyperbolic plane

Truncated pentagonal tiling
Poincaré disk model of the hyperbolic plane
Type	Hyperbolic uniform tiling
Vertex configuration	4.10.10
Schläfli symbol	t{5,4}
Wythoff symbol	2 4 | 5; 2 5 5 |
Coxeter diagram	or
Symmetry group	[5,4], (*542) [5,5], (*552)
Dual	Order-5 tetrakis square tiling
Properties	Vertex-transitive

In geometry, the truncated order-4 pentagonal tiling is a uniform tiling of the hyperbolic plane. It has Schläfli symbol of t_{0,1}{5,4}.

== Uniform colorings ==
A half symmetry [1+,4,5] = [5,5] coloring can be constructed with two colors of decagons. This coloring is called a truncated pentapentagonal tiling.

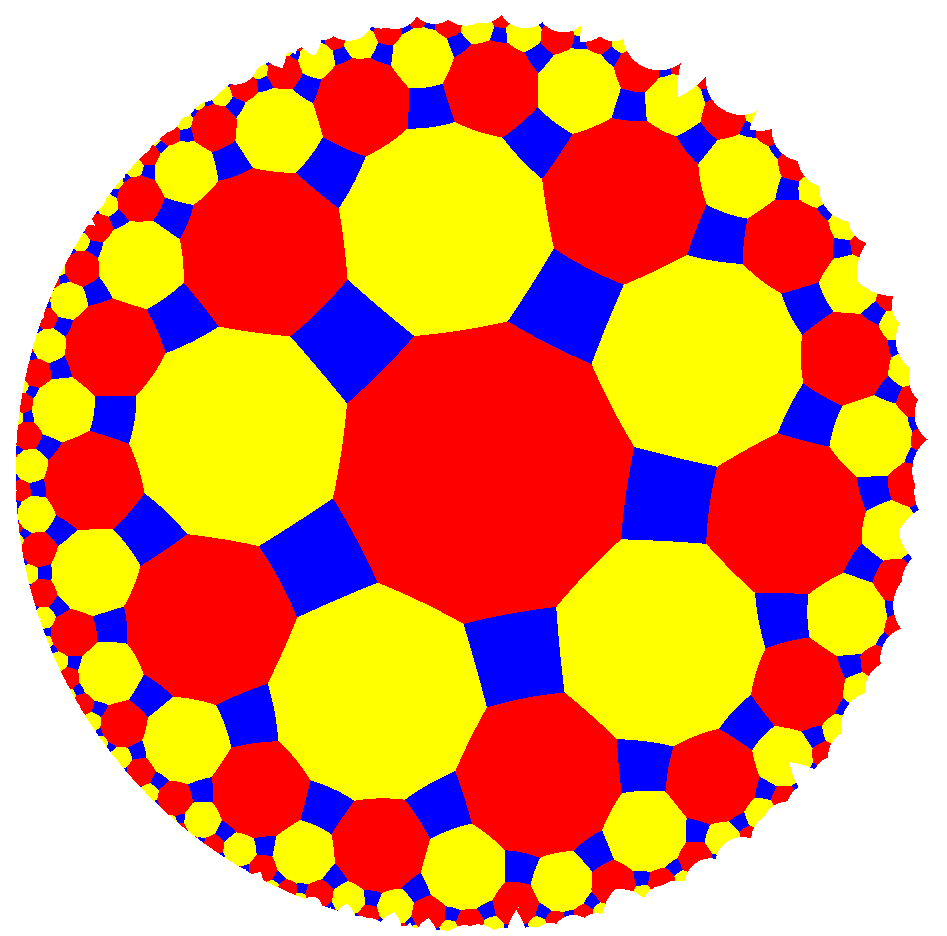

== Symmetry ==
There is only one subgroup of [5,5], [5,5]^{+}, removing all the mirrors. This symmetry can be doubled to 542 symmetry by adding a bisecting mirror.

Small index subgroups of [5,5]
Type	Reflective domains	Rotational symmetry
Index	1	2
Diagram		
Coxeter (orbifold)	[5,5] = = (*552)	[5,5]^{+} = = (552)

== Related polyhedra and tiling ==
*n42 symmetry mutation of truncated tilings: 4.2n.2n
Symmetry *n42 [n,4]	Spherical		Euclidean	Compact hyperbolic				Paracomp.
Symmetry *n42 [n,4]	*242 [2,4]	*342 [3,4]	*442 [4,4]	*542 [5,4]	*642 [6,4]	*742 [7,4]	*842 [8,4]...	*∞42 [∞,4]
Truncated figures								
Config.	4.4.4	4.6.6	4.8.8	4.10.10	4.12.12	4.14.14	4.16.16	4.∞.∞
n-kis figures								
Config.	V4.4.4	V4.6.6	V4.8.8	V4.10.10	V4.12.12	V4.14.14	V4.16.16	V4.∞.∞

Uniform pentagonal/square tilings
Symmetry: [5,4], (*542)							[5,4]^{+}, (542)	[5^{+},4], (5*2)	[5,4,1^{+}], (*552)
{5,4}	t{5,4}	r{5,4}	2t{5,4}=t{4,5}	2r{5,4}={4,5}	rr{5,4}	tr{5,4}	sr{5,4}	s{5,4}	h{4,5}
Uniform duals
V5^{4}	V4.10.10	V4.5.4.5	V5.8.8	V4^{5}	V4.4.5.4	V4.8.10	V3.3.4.3.5	V3.3.5.3.5	V5^{5}

Uniform pentapentagonal tilings
Symmetry: [5,5], (*552)							[5,5]^{+}, (552)
=	=	=	=	=	=	=	=
Order-5 pentagonal tiling {5,5}	Truncated order-5 pentagonal tiling t{5,5}	Order-4 pentagonal tiling r{5,5}	Truncated order-5 pentagonal tiling 2t{5,5} = t{5,5}	Order-5 pentagonal tiling 2r{5,5} = {5,5}	Tetrapentagonal tiling rr{5,5}	Truncated order-4 pentagonal tiling tr{5,5}	Snub pentapentagonal tiling sr{5,5}
Uniform duals
Order-5 pentagonal tiling V5.5.5.5.5	V5.10.10	Order-5 square tiling V5.5.5.5	V5.10.10	Order-5 pentagonal tiling V5.5.5.5.5	V4.5.4.5	V4.10.10	V3.3.5.3.5

== See also ==
- Uniform tilings in hyperbolic plane
- List of regular polytopes
