= 4-5 kisrhombille =

Tiling of the hyperbolic plane

- Type: Dual semiregular hyperbolic tiling
- Wallpaper group: [5,4], (*542)
- Rotation group: [5,4]^{+}, (542)
- Dual: truncated tetrapentagonal tiling
- Face configuration: V4.8.10
- Properties: face-transitive

In geometry, the 4-5 kisrhombille or order-4 bisected pentagonal tiling is a semiregular dual tiling of the hyperbolic plane. It is constructed by congruent right triangles with 4, 8, and 10 triangles meeting at each vertex.

The name 4-5 kisrhombille is by Conway, seeing it as a 4-5 rhombic tiling, divided by a kis operator, adding a center point to each rhombus, and dividing into four triangles.

The image shows a Poincaré disk model projection of the hyperbolic plane.

It is labeled V4.8.10 because each right triangle face has three types of vertices: one with 4 triangles, one with 8 triangles, and one with 10 triangles.

== Dual tiling ==
It is the dual tessellation of the truncated tetrapentagonal tiling which has one square and one octagon and one decagon at each vertex.

== Related polyhedra and tilings ==
*n42 symmetry mutation of omnitruncated tilings: 4.8.2n
Symmetry *n42 [n,4]	Spherical		Euclidean	Compact hyperbolic				Paracomp.
Symmetry *n42 [n,4]	*242 [2,4]	*342 [3,4]	*442 [4,4]	*542 [5,4]	*642 [6,4]	*742 [7,4]	*842 [8,4]...	*∞42 [∞,4]
Omnitruncated figure	4.8.4	4.8.6	4.8.8	4.8.10	4.8.12	4.8.14	4.8.16	4.8.∞
Omnitruncated duals	V4.8.4	V4.8.6	V4.8.8	V4.8.10	V4.8.12	V4.8.14	V4.8.16	V4.8.∞

Uniform pentagonal/square tilings
Symmetry: [5,4], (*542)							[5,4]^{+}, (542)	[5^{+},4], (5*2)	[5,4,1^{+}], (*552)
{5,4}	t{5,4}	r{5,4}	2t{5,4}=t{4,5}	2r{5,4}={4,5}	rr{5,4}	tr{5,4}	sr{5,4}	s{5,4}	h{4,5}
Uniform duals
V5^{4}	V4.10.10	V4.5.4.5	V5.8.8	V4^{5}	V4.4.5.4	V4.8.10	V3.3.4.3.5	V3.3.5.3.5	V5^{5}

== See also ==
- Hexakis triangular tiling
- List of uniform tilings
- Uniform tilings in hyperbolic plane
