= Rhombitetrapentagonal tiling =

Uniform tiling of the hyperbolic plane

Rhombitetrapentagonal tiling
Poincaré disk model of the hyperbolic plane
| Type | Hyperbolic uniform tiling |
| Vertex configuration | 4.4.5.4 |
| Schläfli symbol | rr{5,4} or $r\begin{Bmatrix} 5 \\ 4 \end{Bmatrix}$ |
| Wythoff symbol | 4 | 5 2 |
| Coxeter diagram | or |
| Symmetry group | [5,4], (*542) |
| Dual | Deltoidal tetrapentagonal tiling |
| Properties | Vertex-transitive |

In geometry, the rhombitetrapentagonal tiling is a uniform tiling of the hyperbolic plane. It has Schläfli symbol of t_{0,2}{4,5}.

== Dual tiling ==
The dual is called the deltoidal tetrapentagonal tiling with face configuration V.4.4.4.5.

== Related polyhedra and tiling ==
Uniform pentagonal/square tilings
| Symmetry: [5,4], (*542) | | | | | | | [5,4]^{+}, (542) | [5^{+},4], (5*2) | [5,4,1^{+}], (*552) |
|---|---|---|---|---|---|---|---|---|---|
| {5,4} | t{5,4} | r{5,4} | 2t{5,4}=t{4,5} | 2r{5,4}={4,5} | rr{5,4} | tr{5,4} | sr{5,4} | s{5,4} | h{4,5} |
Uniform duals
| V5^{4} | V4.10.10 | V4.5.4.5 | V5.8.8 | V4^{5} | V4.4.5.4 | V4.8.10 | V3.3.4.3.5 | V3.3.5.3.5 | V5^{5} |

*n42 symmetry mutation of expanded tilings: n.4.4.4
| Symmetry [n,4], (*n42) | Spherical | Euclidean | Compact hyperbolic | | | | Paracomp. |
| Symmetry [n,4], (*n42) | *342 [3,4] | *442 [4,4] | *542 [5,4] | *642 [6,4] | *742 [7,4] | *842 [8,4] | *∞42 [∞,4] |
|---|---|---|---|---|---|---|---|
| Expanded figures | | | | | | | |
| Config. | 3.4.4.4 | 4.4.4.4 | 5.4.4.4 | 6.4.4.4 | 7.4.4.4 | 8.4.4.4 | ∞.4.4.4 |
| Rhombic figures config. | V3.4.4.4 | V4.4.4.4 | V5.4.4.4 | V6.4.4.4 | V7.4.4.4 | V8.4.4.4 | V∞.4.4.4 |

== See also ==
- Uniform tilings in hyperbolic plane
- List of regular polytopes
