= Order-4 pentagonal tiling =

Regular tiling of the hyperbolic plane

Order-4 pentagonal tiling
Poincaré disk model of the hyperbolic plane
Type	Hyperbolic regular tiling
Vertex configuration	5^{4}
Schläfli symbol	{5,4} r{5,5} or $\begin{Bmatrix} 5 \\ 5 \end{Bmatrix}$
Wythoff symbol	4 | 5 2; 2 | 5 5
Coxeter diagram	or
Symmetry group	[5,4], (*542) [5,5], (*552)
Dual	Order-5 square tiling
Properties	Vertex-transitive, edge-transitive, face-transitive

In geometry, the order-4 pentagonal tiling is a regular tiling of the hyperbolic plane. It has Schläfli symbol of {5,4}. It can also be called a pentapentagonal tiling in a bicolored quasiregular form.

== Symmetry ==
This tiling represents a hyperbolic kaleidoscope of 5 mirrors meeting as edges of a regular pentagon. This symmetry by orbifold notation is called *22222 with 5 order-2 mirror intersections. In Coxeter notation can be represented as [5^{*},4], removing two of three mirrors (passing through the pentagon center) in the [5,4] symmetry.

The kaleidoscopic domains can be seen as bicolored pentagons, representing mirror images of the fundamental domain. This coloring represents the uniform tiling t_{1}{5,5} and as a quasiregular tiling is called a pentapentagonal tiling.

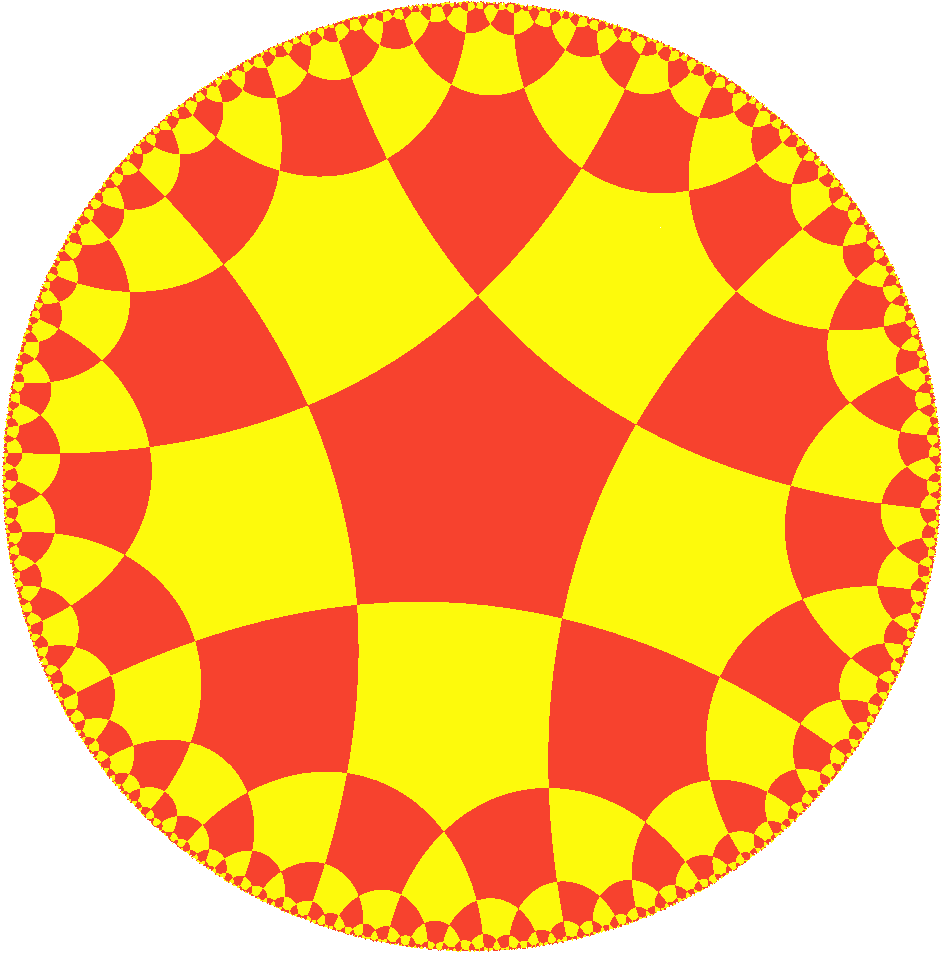

== Related polyhedra and tiling ==
Uniform pentagonal/square tilings
Symmetry: [5,4], (*542)							[5,4]^{+}, (542)	[5^{+},4], (5*2)	[5,4,1^{+}], (*552)
{5,4}	t{5,4}	r{5,4}	2t{5,4}=t{4,5}	2r{5,4}={4,5}	rr{5,4}	tr{5,4}	sr{5,4}	s{5,4}	h{4,5}
Uniform duals
V5^{4}	V4.10.10	V4.5.4.5	V5.8.8	V4^{5}	V4.4.5.4	V4.8.10	V3.3.4.3.5	V3.3.5.3.5	V5^{5}

Uniform pentapentagonal tilings
Symmetry: [5,5], (*552)							[5,5]^{+}, (552)
=	=	=	=	=	=	=	=
Order-5 pentagonal tiling {5,5}	Truncated order-5 pentagonal tiling t{5,5}	Order-4 pentagonal tiling r{5,5}	Truncated order-5 pentagonal tiling 2t{5,5} = t{5,5}	Order-5 pentagonal tiling 2r{5,5} = {5,5}	Tetrapentagonal tiling rr{5,5}	Truncated order-4 pentagonal tiling tr{5,5}	Snub pentapentagonal tiling sr{5,5}
Uniform duals
Order-5 pentagonal tiling V5.5.5.5.5	V5.10.10	Order-5 square tiling V5.5.5.5	V5.10.10	Order-5 pentagonal tiling V5.5.5.5.5	V4.5.4.5	V4.10.10	V3.3.5.3.5

This tiling is topologically related as a part of sequence of regular polyhedra and tilings with pentagonal faces, starting with the dodecahedron, with Schläfli symbol {5,n}, and Coxeter diagram, progressing to infinity.

{5,n} tilings
{5,3}	{5,4}	{5,5}	{5,6}	{5,7}

This tiling is also topologically related as a part of sequence of regular polyhedra and tilings with four faces per vertex, starting with the octahedron, with Schläfli symbol {n,4}, and Coxeter diagram, with n progressing to infinity.

*n42 symmetry mutation of regular tilings: {n,4}
Spherical		Euclidean	Hyperbolic tilings				
2^{4}	3^{4}	4^{4}	5^{4}	6^{4}	7^{4}	8^{4}	...∞^{4}

This tiling is topologically related as a part of sequence of regular polyhedra and tilings with vertex figure (4^{n}).

*n42 symmetry mutation of regular tilings: {4,n}
Spherical	Euclidean	Compact hyperbolic				Paracompact
{4,3}	{4,4}	{4,5}	{4,6}	{4,7}	{4,8}...	{4,∞}

*5n2 symmetry mutations of quasiregular tilings: (5.n)^{2}
Symmetry *5n2 [n,5]	Spherical	Hyperbolic					Paracompact	Noncompact
Symmetry *5n2 [n,5]	*352 [3,5]	*452 [4,5]	*552 [5,5]	*652 [6,5]	*752 [7,5]	*852 [8,5]...	*∞52 [∞,5]	[ni,5]
Figures								
Config.	(5.3)^{2}	(5.4)^{2}	(5.5)^{2}	(5.6)^{2}	(5.7)^{2}	(5.8)^{2}	(5.∞)^{2}	(5.ni)^{2}
Rhombic figures								
Config.	V(5.3)^{2}	V(5.4)^{2}	V(5.5)^{2}	V(5.6)^{2}	V(5.7)^{2}	V(5.8)^{2}	V(5.∞)^{2}	V(5.∞)^{2}

== See also ==
- Square tiling
- Tilings of regular polygons
- List of uniform planar tilings
- List of regular polytopes
