= Tetrapentagonal tiling =

Uniform tiling of the hyperbolic plane

Tetrapentagonal tiling
Poincaré disk model of the hyperbolic plane
Type	Hyperbolic uniform tiling
Vertex configuration	(4.5)^{2}
Schläfli symbol	r{5,4} or $\begin{Bmatrix} 5 \\ 4 \end{Bmatrix}$ rr{5,5} or $r\begin{Bmatrix} 5 \\ 5 \end{Bmatrix}$
Wythoff symbol	2 | 5 4; 5 5 | 2
Coxeter diagram	or or
Symmetry group	[5,4], (*542) [5,5], (*552)
Dual	Order-5-4 rhombille tiling
Properties	Vertex-transitive edge-transitive

In geometry, the tetrapentagonal tiling is a uniform tiling of the hyperbolic plane. It has Schläfli symbol of t_{1}{4,5} or r{4,5}.

== Symmetry ==
A half symmetry [1^{+},4,5] = [5,5] construction exists, which can be seen as two colors of pentagons. This coloring can be called a rhombipentapentagonal tiling.

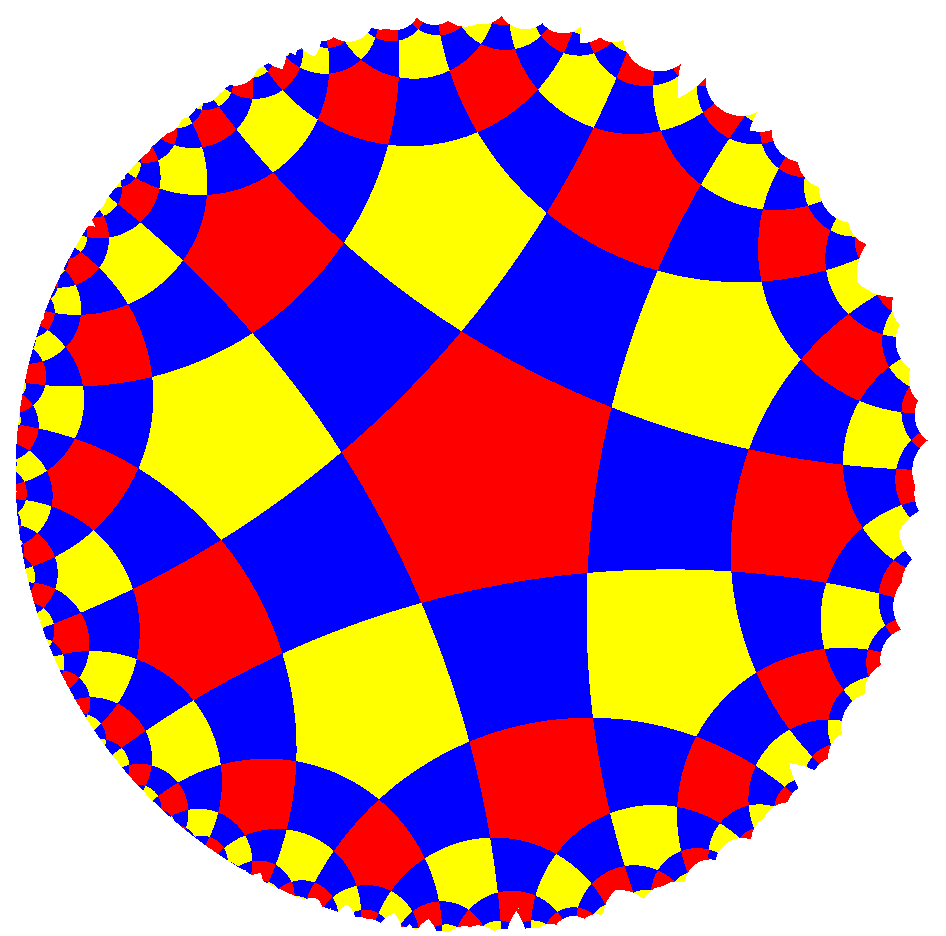

== Dual tiling ==
The dual tiling is made of rhombic faces and has a face configuration V4.5.4.5:

== Related polyhedra and tiling ==
Uniform pentagonal/square tilings
Symmetry: [5,4], (*542)							[5,4]^{+}, (542)	[5^{+},4], (5*2)	[5,4,1^{+}], (*552)
{5,4}	t{5,4}	r{5,4}	2t{5,4}=t{4,5}	2r{5,4}={4,5}	rr{5,4}	tr{5,4}	sr{5,4}	s{5,4}	h{4,5}
Uniform duals
V5^{4}	V4.10.10	V4.5.4.5	V5.8.8	V4^{5}	V4.4.5.4	V4.8.10	V3.3.4.3.5	V3.3.5.3.5	V5^{5}

Uniform pentapentagonal tilings
Symmetry: [5,5], (*552)							[5,5]^{+}, (552)
=	=	=	=	=	=	=	=
Order-5 pentagonal tiling {5,5}	Truncated order-5 pentagonal tiling t{5,5}	Order-4 pentagonal tiling r{5,5}	Truncated order-5 pentagonal tiling 2t{5,5} = t{5,5}	Order-5 pentagonal tiling 2r{5,5} = {5,5}	Tetrapentagonal tiling rr{5,5}	Truncated order-4 pentagonal tiling tr{5,5}	Snub pentapentagonal tiling sr{5,5}
Uniform duals
Order-5 pentagonal tiling V5.5.5.5.5	V5.10.10	Order-5 square tiling V5.5.5.5	V5.10.10	Order-5 pentagonal tiling V5.5.5.5.5	V4.5.4.5	V4.10.10	V3.3.5.3.5

*n42 symmetry mutations of quasiregular tilings: (4.n)^{2}
Symmetry *4n2 [n,4]	Spherical	Euclidean	Compact hyperbolic				Paracompact	Noncompact
Symmetry *4n2 [n,4]	*342 [3,4]	*442 [4,4]	*542 [5,4]	*642 [6,4]	*742 [7,4]	*842 [8,4]...	*∞42 [∞,4]	[ni,4]
Figures								
Config.	(4.3)^{2}	(4.4)^{2}	(4.5)^{2}	(4.6)^{2}	(4.7)^{2}	(4.8)^{2}	(4.∞)^{2}	(4.ni)^{2}

*5n2 symmetry mutations of quasiregular tilings: (5.n)^{2}
Symmetry *5n2 [n,5]	Spherical	Hyperbolic					Paracompact	Noncompact
Symmetry *5n2 [n,5]	*352 [3,5]	*452 [4,5]	*552 [5,5]	*652 [6,5]	*752 [7,5]	*852 [8,5]...	*∞52 [∞,5]	[ni,5]
Figures								
Config.	(5.3)^{2}	(5.4)^{2}	(5.5)^{2}	(5.6)^{2}	(5.7)^{2}	(5.8)^{2}	(5.∞)^{2}	(5.ni)^{2}
Rhombic figures								
Config.	V(5.3)^{2}	V(5.4)^{2}	V(5.5)^{2}	V(5.6)^{2}	V(5.7)^{2}	V(5.8)^{2}	V(5.∞)^{2}	V(5.∞)^{2}

== See also ==
- Binary tiling, an aperiodic tiling of the hyperbolic plane by pentagons
- Uniform tilings in hyperbolic plane
- List of regular polytopes
