= Truncated square tiling =

Semiregular tiling

Truncated square tiling
Truncated square tiling
Type	Semiregular tiling
Vertex configuration	4.8.8
Schläfli symbol	t{4,4} tr{4,4} or $t\begin{Bmatrix} 4 \\ 4 \end{Bmatrix}$
Wythoff symbol	2 | 4 4; 4 4 2 |
Coxeter diagram	or
Symmetry	p4m, [4,4], (*442)
Rotation symmetry	p4, [4,4]^{+}, (442)
Bowers acronym	Tosquat
Dual	Tetrakis square tiling
Properties	Vertex-transitive

In geometry, the truncated square tiling is a semiregular tiling by regular polygons of the Euclidean plane with one square and two octagons on each vertex. This is the only edge-to-edge tiling by regular convex polygons which contains an octagon. It has Schläfli symbol of t{4,4}.

Conway calls it a truncated quadrille, constructed as a truncation operation applied to a square tiling (quadrille).

Other names used for this pattern include Mediterranean tiling and octagonal tiling, which is often represented by smaller squares, and nonregular octagons which alternate long and short edges.

There are 3 regular and 8 semiregular tilings in the plane.

== Uniform colorings ==
There are two distinct uniform colorings of a truncated square tiling. (Naming the colors by indices around a vertex (4.8.8): 122, 123.)

2 colors: 122	3 colors: 123

== Circle packing ==
The truncated square tiling can be used as a circle packing, placing equal diameter circles at the center of every point. Every circle is in contact with 3 other circles in the packing (kissing number).

== Variations ==
The squares from the truncation can be alternately sized. In the limit, half of the vertices can remain untruncated, leading to a chamfered square tiling.

A skew equilateral form with squares into rhombi, and flattened octagons.

One variations on this pattern, often called a Mediterranean pattern, is shown in stone tiles with smaller squares and diagonally aligned with the borders. Other variations stretch the squares or octagons.

The Pythagorean tiling alternates large and small squares, and may be seen as topologically identical to the truncated square tiling. The squares are rotated 45 degrees and octagons are distorted into squares with mid-edge vertices.

A weaving pattern also has the same topology, with octagons flattened rectangles.

p4m, (*442)	p4, (442)		p4g, (4*2)		pmm (*2222)
p4m, (*442)	p4, (442)	cmm, (2*22)			pmm (*2222)
Mediterranean	Pythagorean	Flemish bond	Weaving	Twisted	Rectangular/rhombic

== Related polyhedra and tilings ==
The truncated square tiling is used in an optical illusion with truncated vertices divided and colored alternately, seeming to twist the grid.

The truncated square tiling is topologically related as a part of sequence of uniform polyhedra and tilings with vertex figures 4.2n.2n, extending into the hyperbolic plane:

*n42 symmetry mutation of truncated tilings: 4.2n.2n
Symmetry *n42 [n,4]	Spherical		Euclidean	Compact hyperbolic				Paracomp.
Symmetry *n42 [n,4]	*242 [2,4]	*342 [3,4]	*442 [4,4]	*542 [5,4]	*642 [6,4]	*742 [7,4]	*842 [8,4]...	*∞42 [∞,4]
Truncated figures								
Config.	4.4.4	4.6.6	4.8.8	4.10.10	4.12.12	4.14.14	4.16.16	4.∞.∞
n-kis figures								
Config.	V4.4.4	V4.6.6	V4.8.8	V4.10.10	V4.12.12	V4.14.14	V4.16.16	V4.∞.∞

The 3-dimensional bitruncated cubic honeycomb projected into the plane shows two copies of a truncated tiling. In the plane it can be represented by a compound tiling, or combined can be seen as a chamfered square tiling.

+

=== Wythoff constructions from square tiling ===
Drawing the tiles colored as red on the original faces, yellow at the original vertices, and blue along the original edges, all 8 forms are distinct. However treating faces identically, there are only three unique topologically forms: square tiling, truncated square tiling, snub square tiling.

Uniform tilings based on square tiling symmetry
Symmetry: [4,4], (*442)							[4,4]^{+}, (442)	[4,4^{+}], (4*2)
{4,4}	t{4,4}	r{4,4}	t{4,4}	{4,4}	rr{4,4}	tr{4,4}	sr{4,4}	s{4,4}
Uniform duals
V4.4.4.4	V4.8.8	V4.4.4.4	V4.8.8	V4.4.4.4	V4.4.4.4	V4.8.8	V3.3.4.3.4	

=== Related tilings in other symmetries ===
*n42 symmetry mutation of omnitruncated tilings: 4.8.2n
Symmetry *n42 [n,4]	Spherical		Euclidean	Compact hyperbolic				Paracomp.
Symmetry *n42 [n,4]	*242 [2,4]	*342 [3,4]	*442 [4,4]	*542 [5,4]	*642 [6,4]	*742 [7,4]	*842 [8,4]...	*∞42 [∞,4]
Omnitruncated figure	4.8.4	4.8.6	4.8.8	4.8.10	4.8.12	4.8.14	4.8.16	4.8.∞
Omnitruncated duals	V4.8.4	V4.8.6	V4.8.8	V4.8.10	V4.8.12	V4.8.14	V4.8.16	V4.8.∞

*nn2 symmetry mutations of omnitruncated tilings: 4.2n.2n
Symmetry *nn2 [n,n]	Spherical		Euclidean	Compact hyperbolic				Paracomp.
Symmetry *nn2 [n,n]	*222 [2,2]	*332 [3,3]	*442 [4,4]	*552 [5,5]	*662 [6,6]	*772 [7,7]	*882 [8,8]...	*∞∞2 [∞,∞]
Figure								
Config.	4.4.4	4.6.6	4.8.8	4.10.10	4.12.12	4.14.14	4.16.16	4.∞.∞
Dual								
Config.	V4.4.4	V4.6.6	V4.8.8	V4.10.10	V4.12.12	V4.14.14	V4.16.16	V4.∞.∞

=== Tetrakis square tiling ===
The tetrakis square tiling

The tetrakis square tiling is the tiling of the Euclidean plane dual to the truncated square tiling. It can be constructed square tiling with each square divided into four isosceles right triangles from the center point, forming an infinite arrangement of lines. It can also be formed by subdividing each square of a grid into two triangles by a diagonal, with the diagonals alternating in direction, or by overlaying two square grids, one rotated by 45 degrees from the other and scaled by a factor of √2.

Conway calls it a kisquadrille, represented by a kis operation that adds a center point and triangles to replace the faces of a square tiling (quadrille). It is also called the Union Jack lattice because of the resemblance to the UK flag of the triangles surrounding its degree-8 vertices.

== See also ==
- Euclidean tilings by convex regular polygons
- List of uniform tilings
- Percolation threshold
- Tilings of regular polygons
