= Order-5 square tiling =

Regular tiling of the hyperbolic plane

Order-5 square tiling
Poincaré disk model of the hyperbolic plane
Type	Hyperbolic regular tiling
Vertex configuration	4^{5}
Schläfli symbol	{4,5}
Wythoff symbol	5 | 4 2
Coxeter diagram	
Symmetry group	[5,4], (*542)
Dual	Order-4 pentagonal tiling
Properties	Vertex-transitive, edge-transitive, face-transitive

In geometry, the order-5 square tiling is a regular tiling of the hyperbolic plane. It has Schläfli symbol of {4,5}.

== Related polyhedra and tiling ==
Spherical		Hyperbolic tilings						
{2,5}	{3,5}	{4,5}	{5,5}	{6,5}	{7,5}	{8,5}	...	{∞,5}

This tiling is topologically related as a part of sequence of regular polyhedra and tilings with vertex figure (4^{n}).

*n42 symmetry mutation of regular tilings: {4,n}
Spherical	Euclidean	Compact hyperbolic				Paracompact
{4,3}	{4,4}	{4,5}	{4,6}	{4,7}	{4,8}...	{4,∞}

Uniform pentagonal/square tilings
Symmetry: [5,4], (*542)							[5,4]^{+}, (542)	[5^{+},4], (5*2)	[5,4,1^{+}], (*552)
{5,4}	t{5,4}	r{5,4}	2t{5,4}=t{4,5}	2r{5,4}={4,5}	rr{5,4}	tr{5,4}	sr{5,4}	s{5,4}	h{4,5}
Uniform duals
V5^{4}	V4.10.10	V4.5.4.5	V5.8.8	V4^{5}	V4.4.5.4	V4.8.10	V3.3.4.3.5	V3.3.5.3.5	V5^{5}

This hyperbolic tiling is related to a semiregular infinite skew polyhedron with the same vertex figure in Euclidean 3-space.

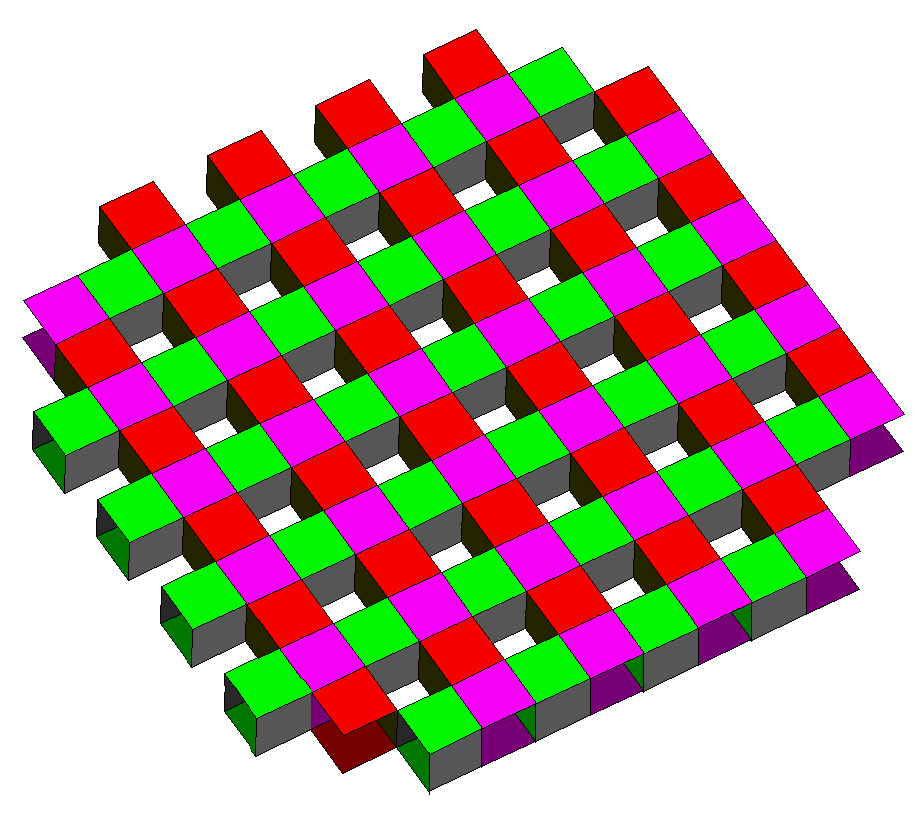

== See also ==
- Square tiling
- Uniform tilings in hyperbolic plane
- List of regular polytopes
- Medial rhombic triacontahedron
