= Tetrakis square tiling =

- Type: Dual semiregular tiling
- Wallpaper group: p4m, [4,4], *442
- Rotation group: p4, [4,4]^{+}, (442)
- Dual: Truncated square tiling
- Face configuration: V4.8.8
- Properties: face-transitive

In geometry, the tetrakis square tiling is a tiling of the Euclidean plane. It is a square tiling with each square divided into four isosceles right triangles from the center point, forming an infinite arrangement of lines. It can also be formed by subdividing each square of a grid into two triangles by a diagonal, with the diagonals alternating in direction, or by overlaying two square grids, one rotated by 45 degrees from the other and scaled by a factor of √2.

Conway, Burgiel, and Goodman-Strauss call it a kisquadrille, represented by a kis operation that adds a center point and triangles to replace the faces of a square tiling (quadrille). It is also called the Union Jack lattice because of the resemblance to the UK flag of the triangles surrounding its degree-8 vertices.

It is labeled V4.8.8 because each isosceles triangle face has two types of vertices: one with 4 triangles, and two with 8 triangles.

== As a dual uniform tiling ==
It is the dual tessellation of the truncated square tiling which has one square and two octagons at each vertex.

== Applications ==
A 5 × 9 portion of the tetrakis square tiling is used to form the board for the Malagasy board game Fanorona. In this game, pieces are placed on the vertices of the tiling, and move along the edges, capturing pieces of the other color until one side has captured all of the other side's pieces. In this game, the degree-4 and degree-8 vertices of the tiling are called respectively weak intersections and strong intersections, a distinction that plays an important role in the strategy of the game. A similar board is also used for the Brazilian game Adugo, and for the game of Hare and Hounds.

The tetrakis square tiling was used for a set of commemorative postage stamps issued by the United States Postal Service in 1997, with an alternating pattern of two different stamps. Compared to the simpler pattern for triangular stamps in which all diagonal perforations are parallel to each other, the tetrakis pattern has the advantage that, when folded along any of its perforations, the other perforations line up with each other, making repeated folding possible.

This tiling also forms the basis for a commonly used "pinwheel", "windmill", and "broken dishes" patterns in quilting.

== Symmetry ==
The symmetry type is:

- with the coloring: cmm; a primitive cell is 8 triangles, a fundamental domain 2 triangles (1/2 for each color)
- with the dark triangles in black and the light ones in white: p4g; a primitive cell is 8 triangles, a fundamental domain 1 triangle (1/2 each for black and white)
- with the edges in black and the interiors in white: p4m; a primitive cell is 2 triangles, a fundamental domain 1/2

The edges of the tetrakis square tiling form a simplicial arrangement of lines, a property it shares with the triangular tiling and the kisrhombille tiling.

These lines form the axes of symmetry of a reflection group (the wallpaper group [4,4], (*442) or p4m), which has the triangles of the tiling as its fundamental domains. This group is isomorphic to, but not the same as, the group of automorphisms of the tiling, which has additional axes of symmetry bisecting the triangles and which has half-triangles as its fundamental domains.

There are many small index subgroups of p4m, [4,4] symmetry (*442 orbifold notation), that can be seen in relation to the Coxeter diagram, with nodes colored to correspond to reflection lines, and gyration points labeled numerically. Rotational symmetry is shown by alternately white and blue colored areas with a single fundamental domain for each subgroup is filled in yellow. Glide reflections are given with dashed lines.

Subgroups can be expressed as Coxeter diagrams, along with fundamental domain diagrams.

Small index subgroups of p4m, [4,4], (*442)
index	1	2			4	
Fundamental domain diagram						
Coxeter notation Coxeter diagram	[1,4,1,4,1] = [4,4]	[1^{+},4,4] =	[4,4,1^{+}] =	[4,1^{+},4] =	[1^{+},4,4,1^{+}] =	[4^{+},4^{+}] = [(4,4^{+},2^{+})]
Orbifold	*442			*2222		22×
Semidirect subgroups
index		2			4	
Diagram						
Coxeter		[4,4^{+}]	[4^{+},4]	[(4,4,2^{+})]	[1^{+},4,1^{+},4]=[(2^{+},4,4)] = =	[4,1^{+},4,1^{+}]=[(4,4,2^{+})] = =
Orbifold		4*2		2*22		
Direct subgroups
Index	2	4			8	
Diagram						
Coxeter	[4,4]^{+}	[1^{+},4,4^{+}] = [4,4^{+}]^{+} =	[4^{+},4,1^{+}] = [4^{+},4]^{+} =	[(4,1^{+},4,2^{+})] = [(4,4,2^{+})]^{+} =	[1^{+},4,1^{+},4,1^{+}] = [(4^{+},4^{+},2^{+})] = [4^{+},4^{+}]^{+} =	
Orbifold	442			2222		

== See also ==
- Tilings of regular polygons
- List of uniform tilings
- Percolation threshold
