= Order-5 pentagonal tiling =

Regular tiling of the hyperbolic plane

Order-5 pentagonal tiling
Poincaré disk model of the hyperbolic plane
| Type | Hyperbolic regular tiling |
| Vertex configuration | 5^{5} |
| Schläfli symbol | {5,5} |
| Wythoff symbol | 5 | 5 2 |
| Coxeter diagram | |
| Symmetry group | [5,5], (*552) |
| Dual | self dual |
| Properties | Vertex-transitive, edge-transitive, face-transitive |

In geometry, the order-5 pentagonal tiling is a regular tiling of the hyperbolic plane. It has Schläfli symbol of {5,5}, constructed from five pentagons around every vertex. As such, it is self-dual.

== Related tilings ==
| Spherical | | Hyperbolic tilings | | | | | | |
|---|---|---|---|---|---|---|---|---|
| {2,5} | {3,5} | {4,5} | {5,5} | {6,5} | {7,5} | {8,5} | ... | {∞,5} |

This tiling is topologically related as a part of sequence of regular polyhedra and tilings with vertex figure (5^{n}).

| Finite | Compact hyperbolic | | | | | Paracompact |
|---|---|---|---|---|---|---|
| {5,3} | {5,4} | {5,5} | {5,6} | {5,7} | {5,8}... | {5,∞} |

Uniform pentapentagonal tilings
| Symmetry: [5,5], (*552) | | | | | | | [5,5]^{+}, (552) |
|---|---|---|---|---|---|---|---|
| = | = | = | = | = | = | = | = |
| Order-5 pentagonal tiling {5,5} | Truncated order-5 pentagonal tiling t{5,5} | Order-4 pentagonal tiling r{5,5} | Truncated order-5 pentagonal tiling 2t{5,5} = t{5,5} | Order-5 pentagonal tiling 2r{5,5} = {5,5} | Tetrapentagonal tiling rr{5,5} | Truncated order-4 pentagonal tiling tr{5,5} | Snub pentapentagonal tiling sr{5,5} |
Uniform duals
| Order-5 pentagonal tiling V5.5.5.5.5 | V5.10.10 | Order-5 square tiling V5.5.5.5 | V5.10.10 | Order-5 pentagonal tiling V5.5.5.5.5 | V4.5.4.5 | V4.10.10 | V3.3.5.3.5 |

== See also ==
- Square tiling
- Uniform tilings in hyperbolic plane
- List of regular polytopes
