= Orbifold notation =

Notation for 2-dimensional spherical, euclidean and hyperbolic symmetry groups

In geometry, orbifold notation (or orbifold signature) is a system, invented by the mathematician William Thurston and promoted by John Conway, for representing types of symmetry groups in two-dimensional spaces of constant curvature. The advantage of the notation is that it describes these groups in a way which indicates many of the groups' properties: in particular, it follows William Thurston in describing the orbifold obtained by taking the quotient of Euclidean space by the group under consideration.

Groups representable in this notation include the point groups on the sphere ($S^2$), the frieze groups and wallpaper groups of the Euclidean plane ($E^2$), and their analogues on the hyperbolic plane ($H^2$).

== Definition of the notation ==
The following types of Euclidean transformation can occur in a group described by orbifold notation:

- reflection through a line (or plane)
- translation by a vector
- rotation of finite order around a point
- infinite rotation around a line in 3-space
- glide-reflection, i.e. reflection followed by translation.

All translations which occur are assumed to form a discrete subgroup of the group symmetries being described.

Each group is denoted in orbifold notation by a finite string made up from the following symbols:

- positive integers $1,2,3,\dots$
- the infinity symbol, $\infty$
- the asterisk, *
- the symbol o (a solid circle in older documents), which is called a wonder and also a handle because it topologically represents a torus (1-handle) closed surface. Patterns repeat by two translation.
- the symbol $\times$ (an open circle in older documents), which is called a miracle and represents a topological crosscap where a pattern repeats as a mirror image without crossing a mirror line.

A string written in boldface represents a group of symmetries of Euclidean 3-space. A string not written in boldface represents a group of symmetries of the Euclidean plane, which is assumed to contain two independent translations.

Each symbol corresponds to a distinct transformation:

- an integer n to the left of an asterisk indicates a rotation of order n around a gyration point
- the asterisk, * indicates a reflection
- an integer n to the right of an asterisk indicates a transformation of order 2n which rotates around a kaleidoscopic point and reflects through a line (or plane)
- an $\times$ indicates a glide reflection
- the symbol $\infty$ indicates infinite rotational symmetry around a line; it can only occur for bold face groups. By abuse of language, we might say that such a group is a subgroup of symmetries of the Euclidean plane with only one independent translation. The frieze groups occur in this way.
- the exceptional symbol o indicates that there are precisely two linearly independent translations.

=== Good orbifolds ===
An orbifold symbol is called good if it is not one of the following: p, pq, *p, *pq, for p, q ≥ 2, and p ≠ q.

== Chirality and achirality ==
An object is chiral if its symmetry group contains no reflections; otherwise it is called achiral. The corresponding orbifold is orientable in the chiral case and non-orientable otherwise.

== The Euler characteristic and the order ==
The Euler characteristic of an orbifold can be read from its Conway symbol, as follows. Each feature has a value:

- n without or before an asterisk counts as $\frac{n-1}{n}$
- n after an asterisk counts as $\frac{n-1}{2 n}$
- asterisk and $\times$ count as 1
- o counts as 2.

Subtracting the sum of these values from 2 gives the Euler characteristic.

If the sum of the feature values is 2, the order is infinite, i.e., the notation represents a wallpaper group or a frieze group. Indeed, Conway's "Magic Theorem" indicates that the 17 wallpaper groups are exactly those with the sum of the feature values equal to 2. Otherwise, the order is 2 divided by the Euler characteristic.

== Equal groups ==
The following groups are isomorphic:

- 1* and *11
- 22 and 221
- *22 and *221
- 2* and 2*1.

This is because 1-fold rotation is the "empty" rotation.

== Two-dimensional groups ==
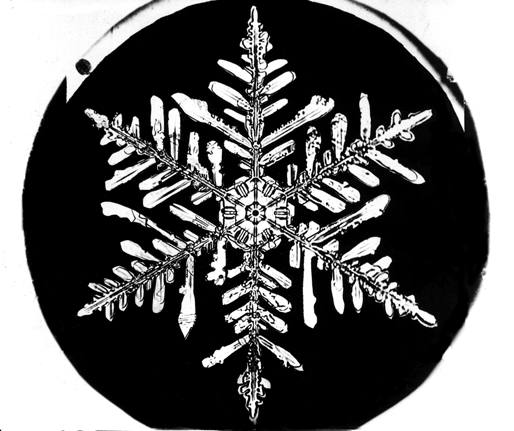
A perfect snowflake would have *6• symmetry,

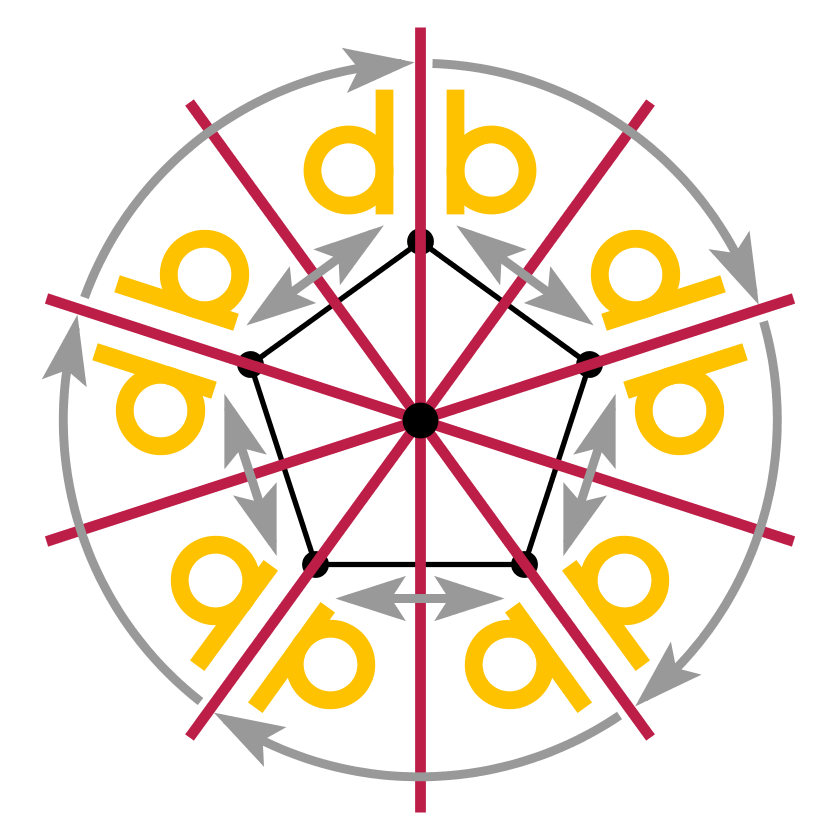
The pentagon has symmetry *5•, the whole image with arrows 5•.

The Flag of Hong Kong has 5 fold rotation symmetry, 5•.

The symmetry of a 2D object without translational symmetry can be described by the 3D symmetry type by adding a third dimension to the object which does not add or spoil symmetry. For example, for a 2D image we can consider a piece of carton with that image displayed on one side; the shape of the carton should be such that it does not spoil the symmetry, or it can be imagined to be infinite. Thus we have n• and *n•. The bullet (•) is added on one- and two-dimensional groups to imply the existence of a fixed point. (In three dimensions these groups exist in an n-fold digonal orbifold and are represented as nn and *nn.)

Similarly, a 1D image can be drawn horizontally on a piece of carton, with a provision to avoid additional symmetry with respect to the line of the image, e.g. by drawing a horizontal bar under the image. Thus the discrete symmetry groups in one dimension are *•, *1•, ∞• and *∞•.

Another way of constructing a 3D object from a 1D or 2D object for describing the symmetry is taking the Cartesian product of the object and an asymmetric 2D or 1D object, respectively.

== Correspondence tables ==
=== Spherical ===
Fundamental domains of reflective 3D point groups
(*11), C_{1v} = C_{s}	(*22), C_{2v}	(*33), C_{3v}	(*44), C_{4v}	(*55), C_{5v}	(*66), C_{6v}
Order 2	Order 4	Order 6	Order 8	Order 10	Order 12
(*221), D_{1h} = C_{2v}	(*222), D_{2h}	(*223), D_{3h}	(*224), D_{4h}	(*225), D_{5h}	(*226), D_{6h}
Order 4	Order 8	Order 12	Order 16	Order 20	Order 24
(*332), T_{d}		(*432), O_{h}		(*532), I_{h}	
Order 24		Order 48		Order 120	

Spherical symmetry groups
Orbifold signature	Coxeter	Schönflies	Hermann–Mauguin	Order
Polyhedral groups
*532	[3,5]	I_{h}	53m	120
532	[3,5]^{+}	I	532	60
*432	[3,4]	O_{h}	m3m	48
432	[3,4]^{+}	O	432	24
*332	[3,3]	T_{d}	4̅3m	24
3*2	[3^{+},4]	T_{h}	m3	24
332	[3,3]^{+}	T	23	12
Dihedral and cyclic groups: n = 3, 4, 5 ...
*22n	[2,n]	D_{nh}	n/mmm or 2n̅m2	4n
2*n	[2^{+},2n]	D_{nd}	2n̅2m or n̅m	4n
22n	[2,n]^{+}	D_{n}	n2	2n
*nn	[n]	C_{nv}	nm	2n
n*	[n^{+},2]	C_{nh}	n/m or 2n̅	2n
n×	[2^{+},2n^{+}]	S_{2n}	2n̅ or n̅	2n
nn	[n]^{+}	C_{n}	n	n
Special cases
*222	[2,2]	D_{2h}	2/mmm or 22̅m2	8
2*2	[2^{+},4]	D_{2d}	22̅2m or 2̅m	8
222	[2,2]^{+}	D_{2}	22	4
*22	[2]	C_{2v}	2m	4
2*	[2^{+},2]	C_{2h}	2/m or 22̅	4
2×	[2^{+},4^{+}]	S_{4}	22̅ or 2̅	4
22	[2]^{+}	C_{2}	2	2
*22	[1,2]	D_{1h} = C_{2v}	1/mmm or 21̅m2	4
2*	[2^{+},2]	D_{1d} = C_{2h}	21̅2m or 1̅m	4
22	[1,2]^{+}	D_{1} = C_{2}	12	2
*1	[ ]	C_{1v} = C_{s}	1m	2
1*	[2,1^{+}]	C_{1h} = C_{s}	1/m or 21̅	2
1×	[2^{+},2^{+}]	S_{2} = C_{i}	21̅ or 1̅	2
1	[ ]^{+}	C_{1}	1	1

=== Euclidean plane ===
==== Frieze groups ====
Frieze groups
IUC	Cox.	Schön.^{*}	Orbifold	Diagram^{§}	Examples and Conway nickname	Description
p1	[∞]^{+}	C_{∞} Z_{∞}	∞∞		hop	(T) Translations only: This group is singly generated, by a translation by the smallest distance over which the pattern is periodic.
p11g	[∞^{+},2^{+}]	S_{∞} Z_{∞}	∞×		step	(TG) Glide-reflections and Translations: This group is singly generated, by a glide reflection, with translations being obtained by combining two glide reflections.
p1m1	[∞]	C_{∞v} Dih_{∞}	*∞∞		sidle	(TV) Vertical reflection lines and Translations: The group is the same as the non-trivial group in the one-dimensional case; it is generated by a translation and a reflection in the vertical axis.
p2	[∞,2]^{+}	D_{∞} Dih_{∞}	22∞		spinning hop	(TR) Translations and 180° Rotations: The group is generated by a translation and a 180° rotation.
p2mg	[∞,2^{+}]	D_{∞d} Dih_{∞}	2*∞		spinning sidle	(TRVG) Vertical reflection lines, Glide reflections, Translations and 180° Rotations: The translations here arise from the glide reflections, so this group is generated by a glide reflection and either a rotation or a vertical reflection.
p11m	[∞^{+},2]	C_{∞h} Z_{∞}×Dih_{1}	∞*		jump	(THG) Translations, Horizontal reflections, Glide reflections: This group is generated by a translation and the reflection in the horizontal axis. The glide reflection here arises as the composition of translation and horizontal reflection
p2mm	[∞,2]	D_{∞h} Dih_{∞}×Dih_{1}	*22∞		spinning jump	(TRHVG) Horizontal and Vertical reflection lines, Translations and 180° Rotations: This group requires three generators, with one generating set consisting of a translation, the reflection in the horizontal axis and a reflection across a vertical axis.

^{*}Schönflies's point group notation is extended here as infinite cases of the equivalent dihedral points symmetries
^{§}The diagram shows one fundamental domain in yellow, with reflection lines in blue, glide reflection lines in dashed green, translation normals in red, and 2-fold gyration points as small green squares.

==== Wallpaper groups ====
Fundamental domains of Euclidean reflective groups
(*442), p4m	(4*2), p4g
(*333), p3m	(632), p6

17 wallpaper groups
Orbifold signature	Coxeter	Hermann– Mauguin	Speiser Niggli	Polya Guggenheim	Fejes Toth Cadwell
*632	[6,3]	p6m	C^{(I)}_{6v}	D_{6}	W^{1}_{6}
632	[6,3]^{+}	p6	C^{(I)}_{6}	C_{6}	W_{6}
*442	[4,4]	p4m	C^{(I)}_{4}	D^{*}_{4}	W^{1}_{4}
4*2	[4^{+},4]	p4g	C^{II}_{4v}	D^{o}_{4}	W^{2}_{4}
442	[4,4]^{+}	p4	C^{(I)}_{4}	C_{4}	W_{4}
*333	[3^{[3]}]	p3m1	C^{II}_{3v}	D^{*}_{3}	W^{1}_{3}
3*3	[3^{+},6]	p31m	C^{I}_{3v}	D^{o}_{3}	W^{2}_{3}
333	[3^{[3]}]^{+}	p3	C^{I}_{3}	C_{3}	W_{3}
*2222	[∞,2,∞]	pmm	C^{I}_{2v}	D_{2}kkkk	W^{2}_{2}
2*22	[∞,2^{+},∞]	cmm	C^{IV}_{2v}	D_{2}kgkg	W^{1}_{2}
22*	[(∞,2)^{+},∞]	pmg	C^{III}_{2v}	D_{2}kkgg	W^{3}_{2}
22×	[∞^{+},2^{+},∞^{+}]	pgg	C^{II}_{2v}	D_{2}gggg	W^{4}_{2}
2222	[∞,2,∞]^{+}	p2	C^{(I)}_{2}	C_{2}	W_{2}
**	[∞^{+},2,∞]	pm	C^{I}_{s}	D_{1}kk	W^{2}_{1}
*×	[∞^{+},2^{+},∞]	cm	C^{III}_{s}	D_{1}kg	W^{1}_{1}
××	[∞^{+},(2,∞)^{+}]	pg	C^{II}_{2}	D_{1}gg	W^{3}_{1}
o	[∞^{+},2,∞^{+}]	p1	C^{(I)}_{1}	C_{1}	W_{1}

=== Hyperbolic plane ===
Poincaré disk model of fundamental domain triangles
Example right triangles (*2pq)
*237	*238	*239	*23∞	
*245	*246	*247	*248	*∞42
*255	*256	*257	*266	*2∞∞
Example general triangles (*pqr)
*334	*335	*336	*337	*33∞
*344	*366	*3∞∞	*6^{3}	*∞^{3}
Example higher polygons (*pqrs...)
*2223	*(23)^{2}	*(24)^{2}	*3^{4}	*4^{4}
*2^{5}	*2^{6}	*2^{7}	*2^{8}	
*222∞	*(2∞)^{2}	*∞^{4}	*2^{∞}	*∞^{∞}

A first few hyperbolic groups, ordered by their Euler characteristic are:

Hyperbolic symmetry groups
−1/χ	Orbifolds	Coxeter
84	*237	[7,3]
48	*238	[8,3]
42	237	[7,3]^{+}
40	*245	[5,4]
36–26.4	*239, *2 3 10	[9,3], [10,3]
26.4	*2 3 11	[11,3]
24	*2 3 12, *246, *334, 3*4, 238	[12,3], [6,4], [(4,3,3)], [3^{+},8], [8,3]^{+}
22.3–21	*2 3 13, *2 3 14	[13,3], [14,3]
20	*2 3 15, *255, 5*2, 245	[15,3], [5,5], [5^{+},4], [5,4]^{+}
19.2	*2 3 16	[16,3]
18 2/3	*247	[7,4]
18	*2 3 18, 239	[18,3], [9,3]^{+}
17.5–16.2	*2 3 19, *2 3 20, *2 3 21, *2 3 22, *2 3 23	[19,3], [20,3], [20,3], [21,3], [22,3], [23,3]
16	*2 3 24, *248	[24,3], [8,4]
15	*2 3 30, *256, *335, 3*5, 2 3 10	[30,3], [6,5], [(5,3,3)], [3^{+},10], [10,3]^{+}
14 2/5–13 1/3	*2 3 36 ... *2 3 70, *249, *2 4 10	[36,3] ... [60,3], [9,4], [10,4]
13 1/5	*2 3 66, 2 3 11	[66,3], [11,3]^{+}
12 8/11	*2 3 105, *257	[105,3], [7,5]
12 4/7	*2 3 132, *2 4 11 ...	[132,3], [11,4], ...
12	*23∞, *2 4 12, *266, 6*2, *336, 3*6, *344, 4*3, *2223, 2*23, 2 3 12, 246, 334	[∞,3] [12,4], [6,6], [6^{+},4], [(6,3,3)], [3^{+},12], [(4,4,3)], [4^{+},6], [∞,3,∞], [12,3]^{+}, [6,4]^{+} [(4,3,3)]^{+}
...

== See also ==
- Mutation of orbifolds
- Fibrifold notation - an extension of orbifold notation for 3d space groups
