= List of tessellations =

This is a list of tessellations.

== Spherical ==
Regular Spherical (n=1, 2, 3, ...)
Article	Vertex configuration	Schläfli symbol	Image
Dihedron	n^{2}	{n,2}	{6,2}
Hosohedron	2^{n}	{2,n}	{2,6}
Spherical tetrahedron	3^{3}	{3,3}	
Spherical octahedron	3^{4}	{3,4}	
Spherical cube	4^{3}	{4,3}	
Spherical icosahedron	3^{5}	{3,5}	
Spherical dodecahedron	5^{3}	{5,3}	

Semi-regular Spherical (n=2, 3, ...)
Article	Vertex configuration	Schläfli symbol	Image
Prism	4.4.n	t{2, n} = { }×{n}	{ }×{6}
Antiprism	3^{3}.n	sr{2,n} = { }⊗{n}	{ }⊗{6}

Dual semi-regular Spherical (n=2, 3, ...)
Article	Vertex configuration	Schläfli symbol	Image
Bipyramid	V4^{2}.n	dt{2, n} = { }+{n}	{ }+{6}
Trapezohedron	V3^{3}.n	dsr{2,n} = { }⨁{n}	{ }⨁{6}

== Planar ==
Regular
Article	Vertex configuration	Schläfli symbol	Image	reference
Apeirogonal hosohedron	2^{∞}	{2,∞}		
Order-2 apeirogonal tiling	∞^{2}	{∞,2}		
Square tiling	4^{4}	{4,4}		
Triangular tiling	3^{6}	{3,6}		
Hexagonal tiling	6^{3}	{6,3}		

Semi-regular
Article	Vertex configuration	Schläfli symbol	Image
Apeirogonal prism	4^{2}.∞	t{2,∞}	
Apeirogonal antiprism	3^{3}.∞	sr{2,∞}	
Snub square tiling	3^{2}.4.3.4	s{4,4}	
Elongated triangular tiling	3^{3}.4^{2}	{3,6}:e	
Snub trihexagonal tiling	3^{4}.6	sr{6,3}	
Rhombitrihexagonal tiling	3.4.6.4	rr{6,3}	
Trihexagonal tiling	3.6.3.6	r{6,3}	
Truncated hexagonal tiling	3.12^{2}	t{6,3}	
Truncated trihexagonal tiling	4.6.12	tr{6,3}	
Truncated square tiling	4.8^{2}	tr{4,4}	

Dual semi-regular
Article	Face configuration	Schläfli symbol	Image
Apeirogonal deltohedron	V3^{3}.∞	dsr{2,∞}	
Apeirogonal bipyramid	V4^{2}.∞	dt{2,∞}	
Cairo pentagonal tiling	V3^{2}.4.3.4	ds{4,4}	
Prismatic pentagonal tiling	V3^{3}.4^{2}	d{3,6}:e	
Floret pentagonal tiling	V3^{4}.6	dsr{6,3}	
Deltoidal trihexagonal tiling	V3.4.6.4	drr{6,3}	
Rhombille tiling	V3.6.3.6	dr{6,3}	
Triakis triangular tiling	V3.12^{2}	dt{6,3}	
Kisrhombille tiling	V4.6.12	dtr{6,3}	
Tetrakis square tiling	4.8^{2}	tr{4,4}	

== Hyperbolic ==
Hyperbolic
Article	Vertex configuration	Schläfli symbol	Image
Snub tetrapentagonal tiling	3^{2}.4.3.5	sr{5,4}	
Snub tetrahexagonal tiling	3^{2}.4.3.6	sr{6,4}	
Snub tetraheptagonal tiling	3^{2}.4.3.7	sr{7,4}	
Snub tetraoctagonal tiling	3^{2}.4.3.8	sr{8,4}	
Snub tetraapeirogonal tiling	3^{2}.4.3.∞	sr{∞,4}	
Snub pentapentagonal tiling	3^{2}.5.3.5	s{5,4}	
Snub pentahexagonal tiling	3^{2}.5.3.6	sr{6,5}	
Snub hexahexagonal tiling	3^{2}.6.3.6	s{6,4}	
Snub hexaoctagonal tiling	3^{2}.6.3.8	sr{8,6}	
Snub heptaheptagonal tiling	3^{2}.7.3.7	sr{7,7}	
Snub octaoctagonal tiling	3^{2}.8.3.8	s{8,4}	
Snub order-6 square tiling	3^{3}.4.3.4	s{4,6}	
Snub apeiroapeirogonal tiling	3^{2}.∞.3.∞	sr{∞,∞}	
Snub triheptagonal tiling	3^{4}.7	sr{7,3}	
Snub trioctagonal tiling	3^{4}.8	sr{8,3}	
Snub triapeirogonal tiling	3^{4}.∞	sr{∞,3}	
Snub order-8 triangular tiling	3^{5}.4	s{3,8}	
Order-7 triangular tiling	3^{7}	{3,7}	
Order-8 triangular tiling	3^{8}	{3,8}	
Infinite-order triangular tiling	3^{∞}	{3,∞}	
Alternated octagonal tiling	3.4.3.4.3.4	h{8,3}	
Alternated order-4 hexagonal tiling	3.4.3.4.3.4.3.4	h{6,4}	
Quarter order-6 square tiling	3.4.6^{2}.4	q{4,6}	
Rhombitriheptagonal tiling	3.4.7.4	rr{7,3}	
Rhombitrioctagonal tiling	3.4.8.4	rr{8,3}	
Rhombitriapeirogonal tiling	3.4.∞.4	rr{∞,3}	
Cantic octagonal tiling	3.6.4.6	h_{2}{8,3}	
Triheptagonal tiling	3.7.3.7	r{7,3}	
Trioctagonal tiling	3.8.3.8	r{8,3}	
Truncated heptagonal tiling	3.14^{2}	t{7,3}	
Truncated octagonal tiling	3.16^{2}	t{8,3}	
Triapeirogonal tiling	3.∞.3.∞	r{∞,3}	
Truncated order-3 apeirogonal tiling	3.∞^{2}	t{∞,3}	
Rhombitetrapentagonal tiling	4^{2}.5.4	rr{5,4}	
Rhombitetrahexagonal tiling	4^{2}.6.4	rr{6,4}	
Rhombitetraheptagonal tiling	4^{2}.7.4	rr{7,4}	
Rhombitetraoctagonal tiling	4^{2}.8.4	rr{8,4}	
Rhombitetraapeirogonal tiling	4^{2}.∞.4	rr{∞,4}	
Order-5 square tiling	4^{5}	{4,5}	
Order-6 square tiling	4^{6}	{4,6}	
Order-7 square tiling	4^{7}	{4,7}	
Order-8 square tiling	4^{8}	{4,8}	
Infinite-order square tiling	4^{∞}	{4,∞}	
Tetrapentagonal tiling	4.5.4.5	r{5,4}	
Tetrahexagonal tiling	4.6.4.6	r{6,4}	
Truncated trihexagonal tiling	4.6.12	tr{6,3}	
Truncated triheptagonal tiling	4.6.14	tr{7,3}	
Order 3-7 kisrhombille	V4.6.14	???	
Truncated trioctagonal tiling	4.6.16	tr{8,3}	
Order 3-8 kisrhombille	V4.6.16	???	
Truncated triapeirogonal tiling	4.6.∞	tr{∞,3}	
Tetraheptagonal tiling	4.7.4.7	r{7,4}	
Tetraoctagonal tiling	4.8.4.8	r{8,4}	
Truncated tetrapentagonal tiling	4.8.10	tr{5,4}	
4-5 kisrhombille	V4.8.10	???	
Truncated tetrahexagonal tiling	4.8.12	tr{6,4}	
Truncated tetraheptagonal tiling	4.8.14	tr{7,4}	
Truncated tetraoctagonal tiling	4.8.16	tr{8,4}	
Truncated tetraapeirogonal tiling	4.8.∞	tr{∞,4}	
Truncated order-4 pentagonal tiling	4.10^{2}	t{5,4}	
Truncated pentahexagonal tiling	4.10.12	tr{6,5}	
Truncated order-4 hexagonal tiling	4.12^{2}	t{6,4}	
Truncated hexaoctagonal tiling	4.12.16	tr{8,6}	
Truncated order-4 heptagonal tiling	4.14^{2}	t{7,4}	
Truncated order-4 octagonal tiling	4.16^{2}	t{8,4}	
Truncated order-4 apeirogonal tiling	4.∞^{2}	t{∞,4}	
Tetraapeirogonal tiling	4.∞.4.∞	r{∞,4}	
Order-4 pentagonal tiling	5^{4}	{5,4}	
Order-5 pentagonal tiling	5^{5}	{5,5}	
Order-6 pentagonal tiling	5^{6}	{5,6}	
Infinite-order pentagonal tiling	5^{∞}	{5,∞}	
Rhombipentahexagonal tiling	5.4.6.4	rr{6,5}	
Pentahexagonal tiling	5.6.5.6	r{6,5}	
Truncated order-5 square tiling	5.8^{2}	t{4,5}	
Truncated order-5 pentagonal tiling	5.10^{2}	t{5,5}	
Truncated order-5 hexagonal tiling	5.12^{2}	t{6,5}	
Pentaapeirogonal tiling	5.∞.5.∞	r{∞,5}	
Order-4 hexagonal tiling	6^{4}	{6,4}	
Order-5 hexagonal tiling	6^{5}	{6,5}	
Order-6 hexagonal tiling	6^{6}	{6,6}	
Order-8 hexagonal tiling	6^{8}	{6,8}	
Rhombihexaoctagonal tiling	6.4.8.4	rr{8,6}	
Hexaoctagonal tiling	6.8.6.8	r{8,6}	
Truncated order-6 square tiling	6.8^{2}	t{4,6}	
Truncated order-6 pentagonal tiling	6.10^{2}	t{5,6}	
Truncated order-6 hexagonal tiling	6.12^{2}	t{6,6}	
Truncated order-6 octagonal tiling	6.16^{2}	t{8,6}	
Heptagonal tiling	7^{3}	{7,3}	
Order-4 heptagonal tiling	7^{4}	{7,4}	
Order-7 heptagonal tiling	7^{7}	{7,7}	
Truncated order-7 triangular tiling	7.6^{2}	t{3,7}	
Truncated order-7 square tiling	7.8^{2}	t{4,7}	
Truncated order-7 heptagonal tiling	7.14^{2}	t{7,7}	
Octagonal tiling	8^{3}	{8,3}	
Order-4 octagonal tiling	8^{4}	{8,4}	
Order-6 octagonal tiling	8^{6}	{8,6}	
Order-8 octagonal tiling	8^{8}	{8,8}	
Truncated order-8 hexagonal tiling	8^{12}	t{6,8}	
Truncated order-8 triangular tiling	8.6^{2}	t{3,8}	
Truncated order-8 octagonal tiling	8.16^{2}	t{8,8}	
Order-7 heptagrammic tiling	(7/2)^{7}	{7/2,7}	
Order-3 apeirogonal tiling	∞^{3}	{∞,3}	
Order-4 apeirogonal tiling	∞^{4}	{∞,4}	
Order-5 apeirogonal tiling	∞^{5}	{∞,5}	
Infinite-order apeirogonal tiling	∞^{∞}	{∞,∞}	
Truncated infinite-order triangular tiling	∞.6^{2}	t{3,∞}	
Truncated infinite-order square tiling	∞.8^{2}	t{4,∞}	

== See also ==
- Tessellation
- Uniform tiling
  - Convex uniform honeycombs
  - List of k-uniform tilings
  - List of Euclidean uniform tilings
  - Uniform tilings in hyperbolic plane
