= Cantic order-4 hexagonal tiling =

Uniform tiling of the hyperbolic plane

Cantic order-4 hexagonal tiling
Poincaré disk model of the hyperbolic plane
Type	Hyperbolic uniform tiling
Vertex configuration	3.8.4.8
Schläfli symbol	t_{0,1}(4,4,3)
Wythoff symbol	4 4 | 3
Coxeter diagram	
Symmetry group	[(4,4,3)], (*443)
Dual	Order-4-4-3 t01 dual tiling
Properties	Vertex-transitive

In geometry, the cantic order-4 hexagonal tiling is a uniform tiling of the hyperbolic plane. It has Schläfli symbol of t_{0,1}{(4,4,3)} or h_{2}{6,4}.

== Related polyhedra and tiling ==
Uniform (4,4,3) tilings
Symmetry: [(4,4,3)] (*443)							[(4,4,3)]^{+} (443)	[(4,4,3^{+})] (3*22)	[(4,1^{+},4,3)] (*3232)	
h{6,4} t_{0}(4,4,3)	h_{2}{6,4} t_{0,1}(4,4,3)	{4,6}^{1}/_{2} t_{1}(4,4,3)	h_{2}{6,4} t_{1,2}(4,4,3)	h{6,4} t_{2}(4,4,3)	r{6,4}^{1}/_{2} t_{0,2}(4,4,3)	t{4,6}^{1}/_{2} t_{0,1,2}(4,4,3)	s{4,6}^{1}/_{2} s(4,4,3)	hr{4,6}^{1}/_{2} hr(4,3,4)	h{4,6}^{1}/_{2} h(4,3,4)	q{4,6} h_{1}(4,3,4)
Uniform duals
V(3.4)^{4}	V3.8.4.8	V(4.4)^{3}	V3.8.4.8	V(3.4)^{4}	V4.6.4.6	V6.8.8	V3.3.3.4.3.4	V(4.4.3)^{2}	V6^{6}	V4.3.4.6.6

== See also ==
- Hyperbolic space
- Square tiling
- Uniform tilings in hyperbolic plane
- List of regular polytopes
