= Isogon =

An isogon may refer to:

- Isogonal figure - a polygon or polyhedron with all of its vertices equivalent under the symmetries of the figure.
- A type of contour line Contour line#Types
