= Truncated tetrahexagonal tiling =

Semiregular tiling of the hyperbolic plane

Truncated tetrahexagonal tiling
Poincaré disk model of the hyperbolic plane
Type	Hyperbolic uniform tiling
Vertex configuration	4.8.12
Schläfli symbol	tr{6,4} or $t\begin{Bmatrix} 6 \\ 4 \end{Bmatrix}$
Wythoff symbol	2 6 4 |
Coxeter diagram	or
Symmetry group	[6,4], (*642)
Dual	Order-4-6 kisrhombille tiling
Properties	Vertex-transitive

In geometry, the truncated tetrahexagonal tiling is a semiregular tiling of the hyperbolic plane. There are one square, one octagon, and one dodecagon on each vertex. It has Schläfli symbol of tr{6,4}.

== Dual tiling ==
The dual tiling is called an order-4-6 kisrhombille tiling, made as a complete bisection of the order-4 hexagonal tiling, here with triangles shown in alternating colors. This tiling represents the fundamental triangular domains of [6,4] (*642) symmetry.

== Related polyhedra and tilings ==
*n42 symmetry mutation of omnitruncated tilings: 4.8.2n
Symmetry *n42 [n,4]	Spherical		Euclidean	Compact hyperbolic				Paracomp.
Symmetry *n42 [n,4]	*242 [2,4]	*342 [3,4]	*442 [4,4]	*542 [5,4]	*642 [6,4]	*742 [7,4]	*842 [8,4]...	*∞42 [∞,4]
Omnitruncated figure	4.8.4	4.8.6	4.8.8	4.8.10	4.8.12	4.8.14	4.8.16	4.8.∞
Omnitruncated duals	V4.8.4	V4.8.6	V4.8.8	V4.8.10	V4.8.12	V4.8.14	V4.8.16	V4.8.∞

*nn2 symmetry mutations of omnitruncated tilings: 4.2n.2n
Symmetry *nn2 [n,n]	Spherical		Euclidean	Compact hyperbolic				Paracomp.
Symmetry *nn2 [n,n]	*222 [2,2]	*332 [3,3]	*442 [4,4]	*552 [5,5]	*662 [6,6]	*772 [7,7]	*882 [8,8]...	*∞∞2 [∞,∞]
Figure								
Config.	4.4.4	4.6.6	4.8.8	4.10.10	4.12.12	4.14.14	4.16.16	4.∞.∞
Dual								
Config.	V4.4.4	V4.6.6	V4.8.8	V4.10.10	V4.12.12	V4.14.14	V4.16.16	V4.∞.∞

From a Wythoff construction there are fourteen hyperbolic uniform tilings that can be based from the regular order-4 hexagonal tiling.

Drawing the tiles colored as red on the original faces, yellow at the original vertices, and blue along the original edges, there are 7 forms with full [6,4] symmetry, and 7 with subsymmetry.

Uniform tetrahexagonal tilings
Symmetry: [6,4], (*642) (with [6,6] (*662), [(4,3,3)] (*443) , [∞,3,∞] (*3222) index 2 subsymmetries) (And [(∞,3,∞,3)] (*3232) index 4 subsymmetry)
= = =	=	= = =	=	= = =	=	
{6,4}	t{6,4}	r{6,4}	t{4,6}	{4,6}	rr{6,4}	tr{6,4}
Uniform duals
V6^{4}	V4.12.12	V(4.6)^{2}	V6.8.8	V4^{6}	V4.4.4.6	V4.8.12
Alternations
[1^{+},6,4] (*443)	[6^{+},4] (6*2)	[6,1^{+},4] (*3222)	[6,4^{+}] (4*3)	[6,4,1^{+}] (*662)	[(6,4,2^{+})] (2*32)	[6,4]^{+} (642)
=	=	=	=	=	=	
h{6,4}	s{6,4}	hr{6,4}	s{4,6}	h{4,6}	hrr{6,4}	sr{6,4}

== Symmetry ==
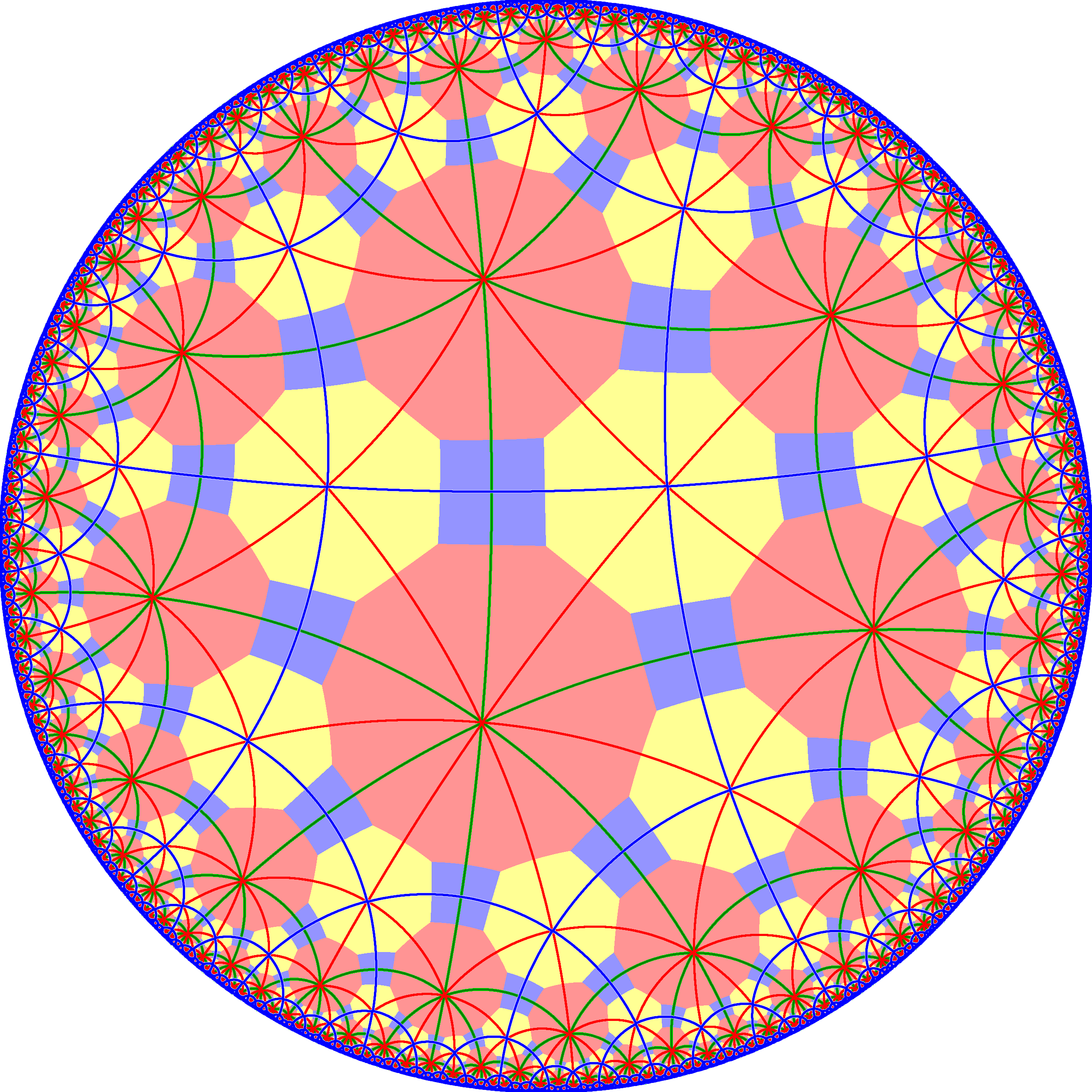
Truncated tetrahexagonal tiling with mirror lines in green, red, and blue:

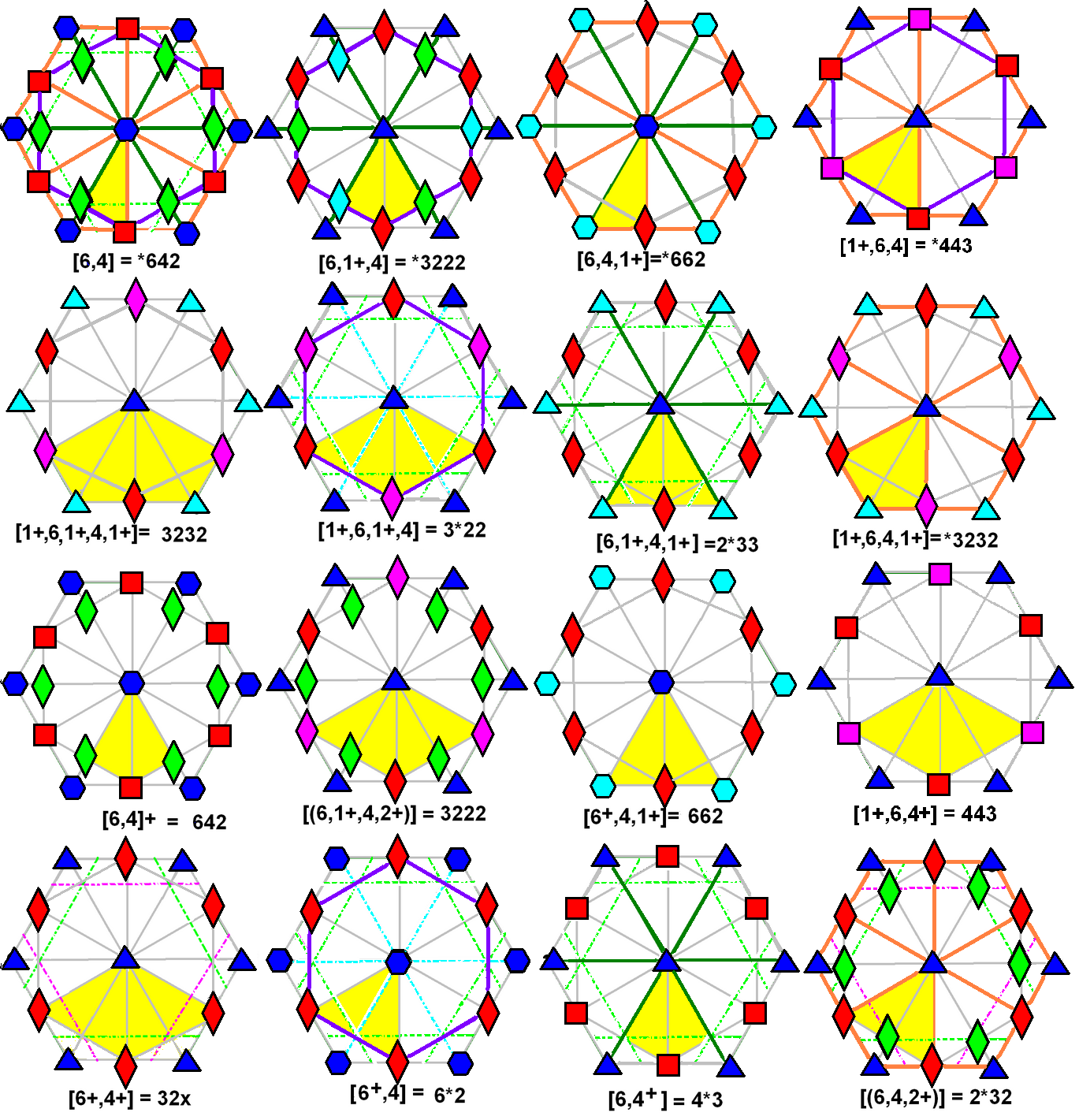
Symmetry diagrams for small index subgroups of [6,4], shown in a hexagonal translational cell within a {6,6} tiling, with a fundamental domain in yellow.

The dual of the tiling represents the fundamental domains of (*642) orbifold symmetry. From [6,4] symmetry, there are 15 small index subgroup by mirror removal and alternation operators. Mirrors can be removed if its branch orders are all even, and cuts neighboring branch orders in half. Removing two mirrors leaves a half-order gyration point where the removed mirrors met. In these images unique mirrors are colored red, green, and blue, and alternately colored triangles show the location of gyration points. The [6^{+},4^{+}], (32×) subgroup has narrow lines representing glide reflections. The subgroup index-8 group, [1^{+},6,1^{+},4,1^{+}] (3232) is the commutator subgroup of [6,4].

Larger subgroup constructed as [6,4*], removing the gyration points of [6,4^{+}], (3*22), index 6 becomes (*3333), and [6*,4], removing the gyration points of [6^{+},4], (2*33), index 12 as (*222222). Finally their direct subgroups [6,4*]^{+}, [6*,4]^{+}, subgroup indices 12 and 24 respectively, can be given in orbifold notation as (3333) and (222222).

Small index subgroups of [6,4]
Index	1	2			4	
Diagram						
Coxeter	[6,4] = =	[1^{+},6,4] =	[6,4,1^{+}] = =	[6,1^{+},4] =	[1^{+},6,4,1^{+}] =	[6^{+},4^{+}]
Generators	{0,1,2}	{1,010,2}	{0,1,212}	{0,101,2,121}	{1,010,212,20102}	{012,021}
Orbifold	*642	*443	*662	*3222	*3232	32×
Semidirect subgroups
Diagram						
Coxeter		[6,4^{+}]	[6^{+},4]	[(6,4,2^{+})]	[6,1^{+},4,1^{+}] = = = =	[1^{+},6,1^{+},4] = = = =
Generators		{0,12}	{01,2}	{1,02}	{0,101,1212}	{0101,2,121}
Orbifold		4*3	6*2	2*32	2*33	3*22
Direct subgroups
Index	2	4			8	
Diagram						
Coxeter	[6,4]^{+} =	[6,4^{+}]^{+} =	[6^{+},4]^{+} =	[(6,4,2^{+})]^{+} =	[6^{+},4^{+}]^{+} = [1^{+},6,1^{+},4,1^{+}] = = =	
Generators	{01,12}	{(01)^{2},12}	{01,(12)^{2}}	{02,(01)^{2},(12)^{2}}	{(01)^{2},(12)^{2},2(01)^{2}2}	
Orbifold	642	443	662	3222	3232	
Radical subgroups
Index		8	12	16	24	
Diagram						
Coxeter		[6,4*] =	[6*,4]	[6,4*]^{+} =	[6*,4]^{+}	
Orbifold		*3333	*222222	3333	222222	

== See also ==
- Tilings of regular polygons
- List of uniform planar tilings
