= Rhombitetrahexagonal tiling =

Uniform tiling of the hyperbolic plane

Rhombitetrahexagonal tiling
Poincaré disk model of the hyperbolic plane
Type	Hyperbolic uniform tiling
Vertex configuration	4.4.6.4
Schläfli symbol	rr{6,4} or $r\begin{Bmatrix} 6 \\ 4 \end{Bmatrix}$
Wythoff symbol	4 | 6 2
Coxeter diagram	
Symmetry group	[6,4], (*642)
Dual	Deltoidal tetrahexagonal tiling
Properties	Vertex-transitive

In geometry, the rhombitetrahexagonal tiling is a uniform tiling of the hyperbolic plane. It has Schläfli symbol of rr{6,4}. It can be seen as constructed as a rectified tetrahexagonal tiling, r{6,4}, as well as an expanded order-4 hexagonal tiling or expanded order-6 square tiling.

== Constructions ==
There are two uniform constructions of this tiling, one from [6,4] or (*642) symmetry, and secondly removing the mirror middle, [6,1^{+},4], gives a rectangular fundamental domain [∞,3,∞], (*3222).

Two uniform constructions of 4.4.4.6
Name	Rhombitetrahexagonal tiling	
Image		
Symmetry	[6,4] (*642)	[6,1^{+},4] = [∞,3,∞] (*3222) =
Schläfli symbol	rr{6,4}	t_{0,1,2,3}{∞,3,∞}
Coxeter diagram		=

There are 3 lower symmetry forms seen by including edge-colorings: sees the hexagons as truncated triangles, with two color edges, with [6,4^{+}] (4*3) symmetry. sees the yellow squares as rectangles, with two color edges, with [6^{+},4] (6*2) symmetry. A final quarter symmetry combines these colorings, with [6^{+},4^{+}] (32×) symmetry, with 2 and 3 fold gyration points and glide reflections.

Lower symmetry constructions
[6,4], (*632)	[6,4^{+}], (4*3)
[6^{+},4], (6*2)	[6^{+},4^{+}], (32×)

This four color tiling is related to a semiregular infinite skew polyhedron with the same vertex figure in Euclidean 3-space with a prismatic honeycomb construction of.

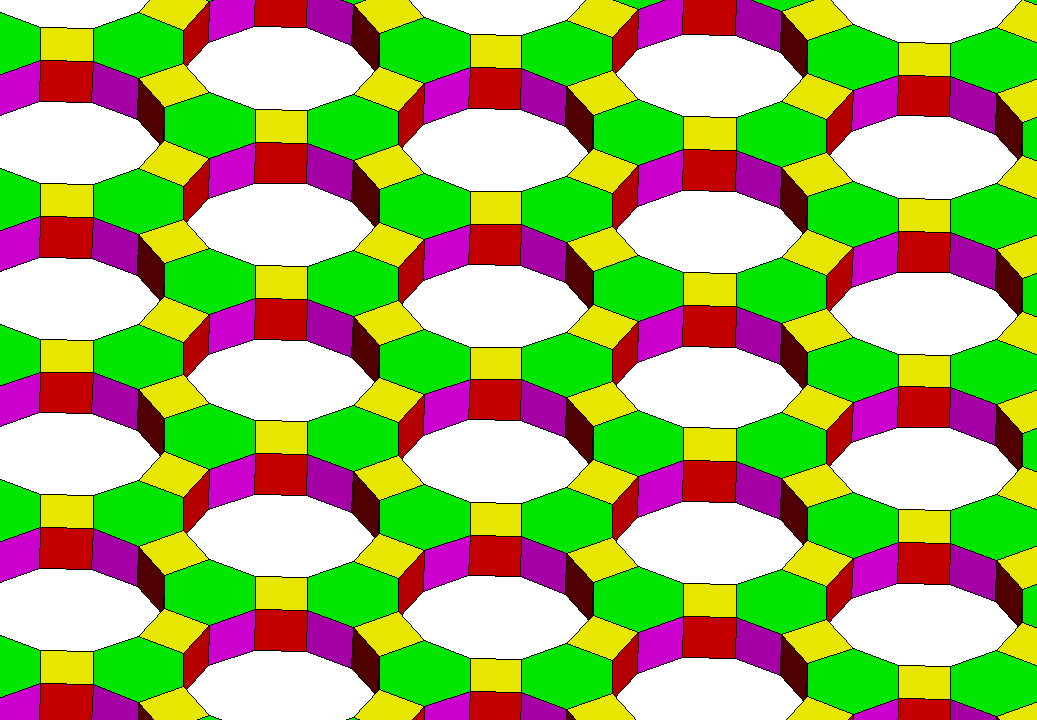

== Symmetry ==
The dual tiling, called a deltoidal tetrahexagonal tiling, represents the fundamental domains of the *3222 orbifold, shown here from three different centers. Its fundamental domain is a Lambert quadrilateral, with 3 right angles. This symmetry can be seen from a [6,4], (*642) triangular symmetry with one mirror removed, constructed as [6,1^{+},4], (*3222). Removing half of the blue mirrors doubles the domain again into *3322 symmetry.

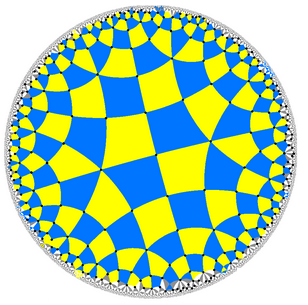
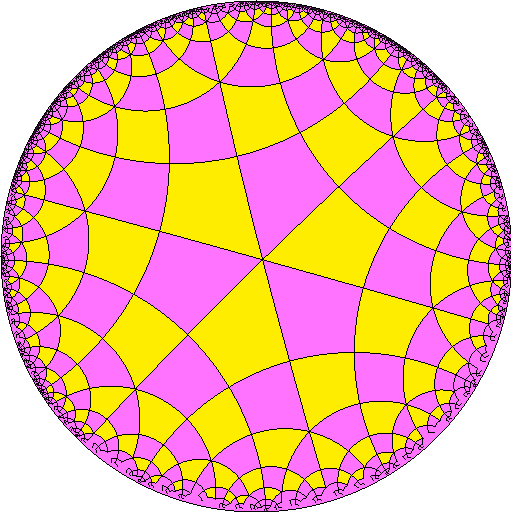
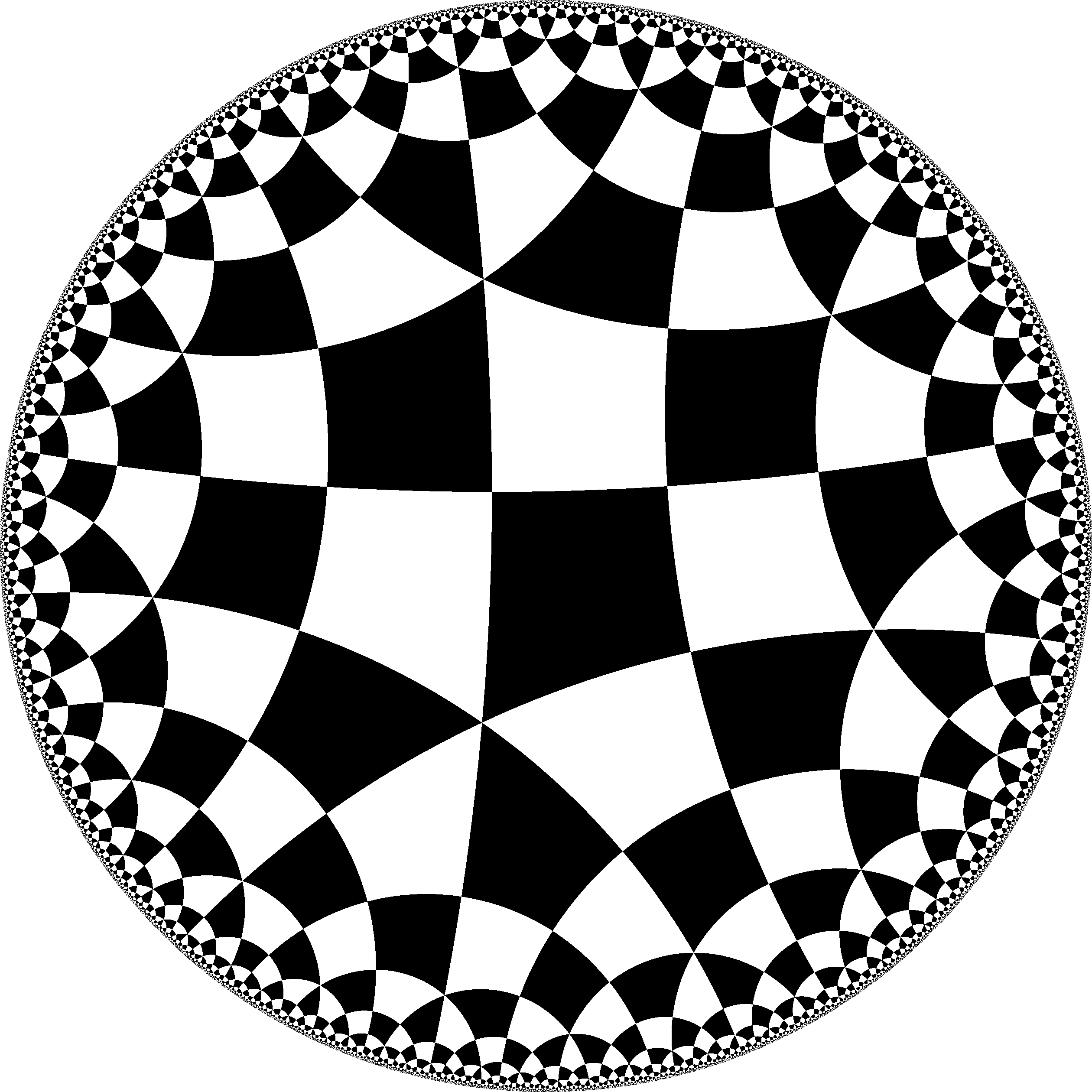
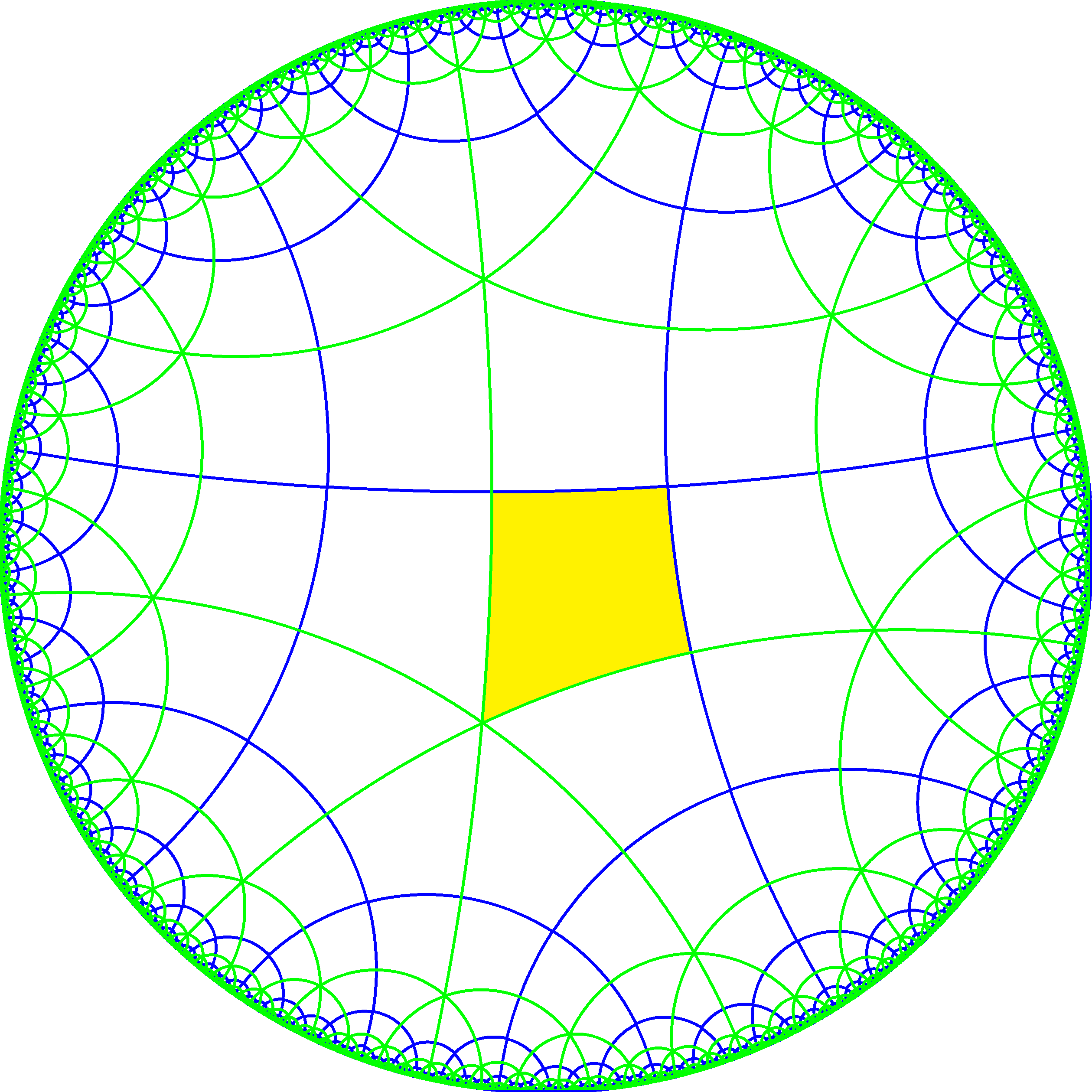

== Related polyhedra and tiling ==
*n42 symmetry mutation of expanded tilings: n.4.4.4
Symmetry [n,4], (*n42)	Spherical	Euclidean	Compact hyperbolic				Paracomp.
Symmetry [n,4], (*n42)	*342 [3,4]	*442 [4,4]	*542 [5,4]	*642 [6,4]	*742 [7,4]	*842 [8,4]	*∞42 [∞,4]
Expanded figures							
Config.	3.4.4.4	4.4.4.4	5.4.4.4	6.4.4.4	7.4.4.4	8.4.4.4	∞.4.4.4
Rhombic figures config.	V3.4.4.4	V4.4.4.4	V5.4.4.4	V6.4.4.4	V7.4.4.4	V8.4.4.4	V∞.4.4.4

Uniform tetrahexagonal tilings
Symmetry: [6,4], (*642) (with [6,6] (*662), [(4,3,3)] (*443) , [∞,3,∞] (*3222) index 2 subsymmetries) (And [(∞,3,∞,3)] (*3232) index 4 subsymmetry)
= = =	=	= = =	=	= = =	=	
{6,4}	t{6,4}	r{6,4}	t{4,6}	{4,6}	rr{6,4}	tr{6,4}
Uniform duals
V6^{4}	V4.12.12	V(4.6)^{2}	V6.8.8	V4^{6}	V4.4.4.6	V4.8.12
Alternations
[1^{+},6,4] (*443)	[6^{+},4] (6*2)	[6,1^{+},4] (*3222)	[6,4^{+}] (4*3)	[6,4,1^{+}] (*662)	[(6,4,2^{+})] (2*32)	[6,4]^{+} (642)
=	=	=	=	=	=	
h{6,4}	s{6,4}	hr{6,4}	s{4,6}	h{4,6}	hrr{6,4}	sr{6,4}

Uniform tilings in symmetry *3222
6^{4}	6.6.4.4	(3.4.4)^{2}	4.3.4.3.3.3
6.6.4.4	6.4.4.4	3.4.4.4.4	
(3.4.4)^{2}	3.4.4.4.4	4^{6}	

== See also ==
- Square tiling
- Tilings of regular polygons
- List of uniform planar tilings
- List of regular polytopes
