= Snub order-6 square tiling =

Uniform tiling of the hyperbolic plane

Snub order-6 square tiling
Poincaré disk model of the hyperbolic plane
Type	Hyperbolic uniform tiling
Vertex configuration	3.3.3.4.3.4
Schläfli symbol	s(4,4,3) s{4,6}
Wythoff symbol	| 4 4 3
Coxeter diagram	
Symmetry group	[(4,4,3)]^{+}, (443) [6,4^{+}], (4*3)
Dual	Order-4-4-3 snub dual tiling
Properties	Vertex-transitive

In geometry, the snub order-6 square tiling is a uniform tiling of the hyperbolic plane. It has Schläfli symbol of s{(4,4,3)} or s{4,6}.

== Images ==
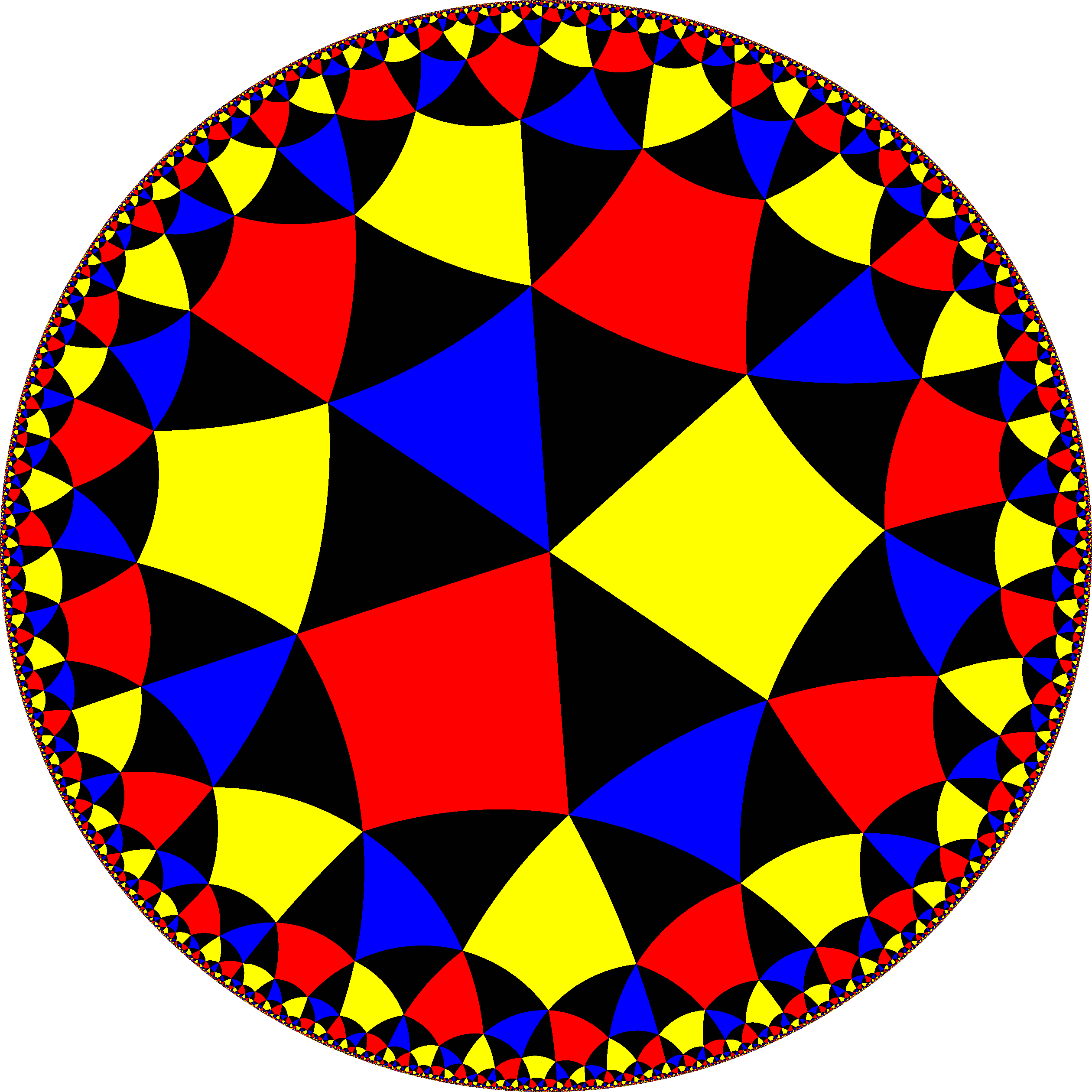
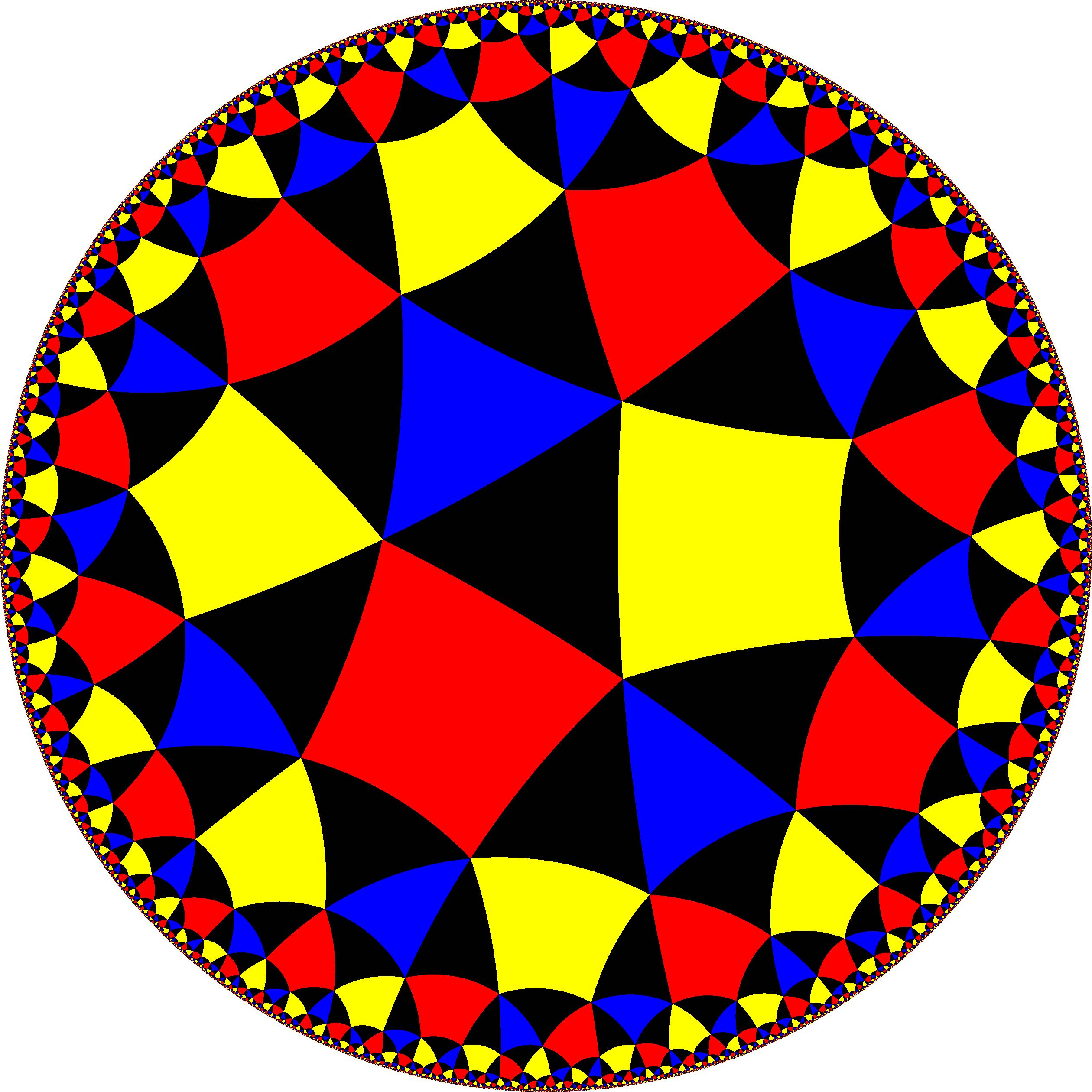

== Symmetry ==
The symmetry is doubled as a snub order-6 square tiling, with only one color of square. It has Schläfli symbol of s{4,6}.

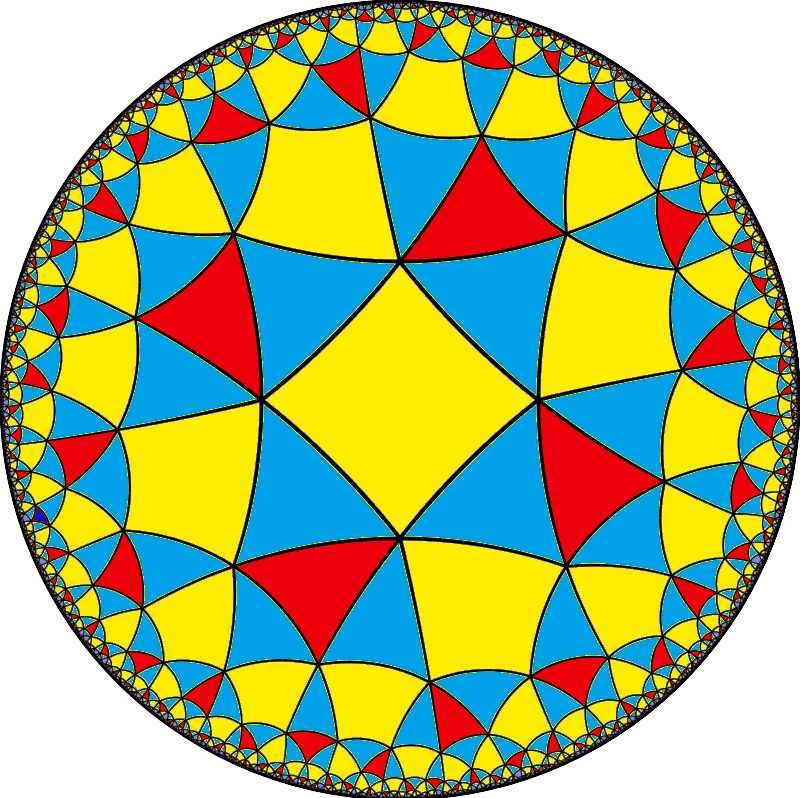

== Related polyhedra and tiling ==
The vertex figure 3.3.3.4.3.4 does not uniquely generate a uniform hyperbolic tiling. Another with quadrilateral fundamental domain (3 2 2 2) and 2*32 symmetry is generated by:

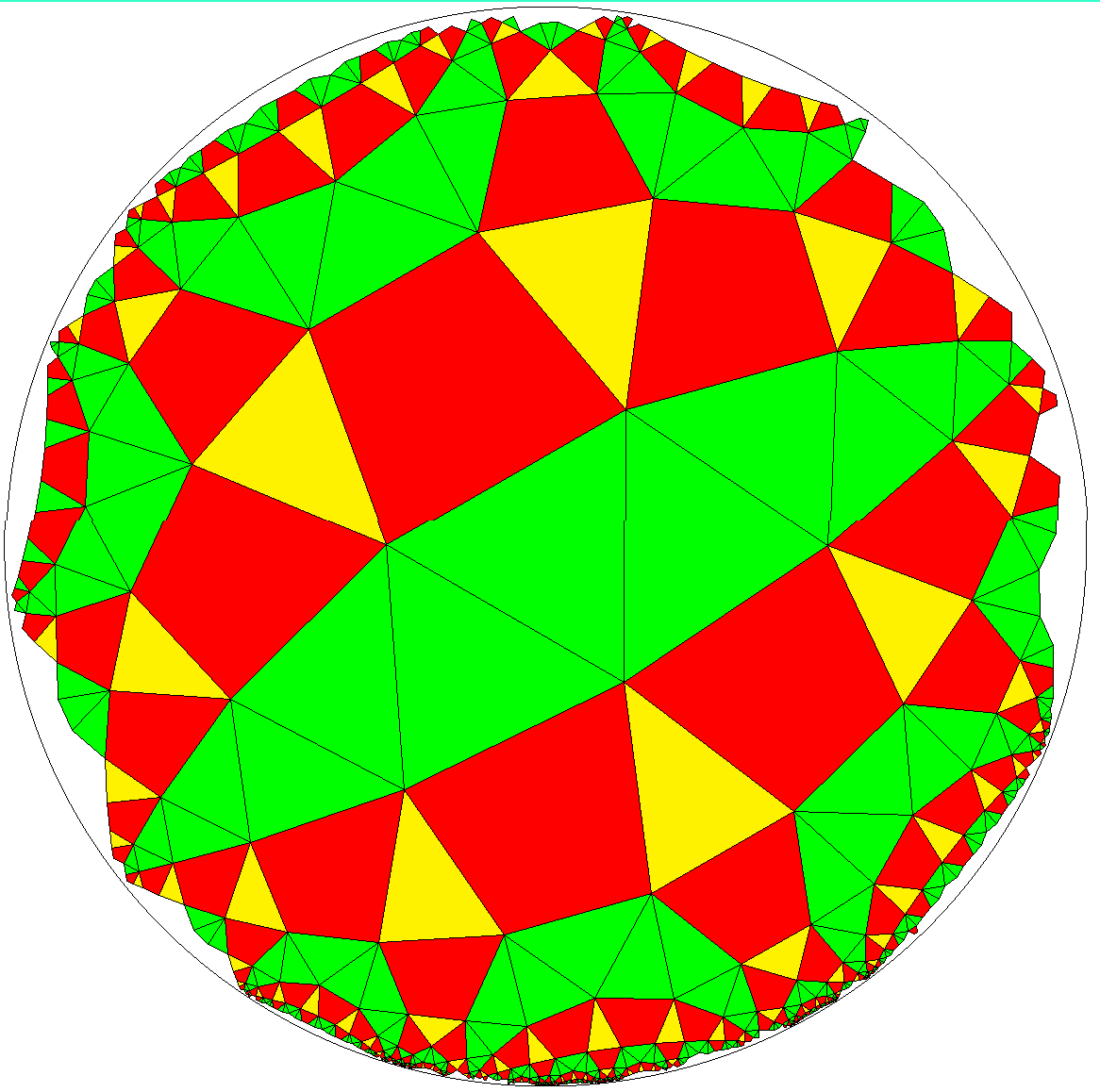

Uniform (4,4,3) tilings
Symmetry: [(4,4,3)] (*443)							[(4,4,3)]^{+} (443)	[(4,4,3^{+})] (3*22)	[(4,1^{+},4,3)] (*3232)	
h{6,4} t_{0}(4,4,3)	h_{2}{6,4} t_{0,1}(4,4,3)	{4,6}^{1}/_{2} t_{1}(4,4,3)	h_{2}{6,4} t_{1,2}(4,4,3)	h{6,4} t_{2}(4,4,3)	r{6,4}^{1}/_{2} t_{0,2}(4,4,3)	t{4,6}^{1}/_{2} t_{0,1,2}(4,4,3)	s{4,6}^{1}/_{2} s(4,4,3)	hr{4,6}^{1}/_{2} hr(4,3,4)	h{4,6}^{1}/_{2} h(4,3,4)	q{4,6} h_{1}(4,3,4)
Uniform duals
V(3.4)^{4}	V3.8.4.8	V(4.4)^{3}	V3.8.4.8	V(3.4)^{4}	V4.6.4.6	V6.8.8	V3.3.3.4.3.4	V(4.4.3)^{2}	V6^{6}	V4.3.4.6.6

Uniform tetrahexagonal tilings
Symmetry: [6,4], (*642) (with [6,6] (*662), [(4,3,3)] (*443) , [∞,3,∞] (*3222) index 2 subsymmetries) (And [(∞,3,∞,3)] (*3232) index 4 subsymmetry)
= = =	=	= = =	=	= = =	=	
{6,4}	t{6,4}	r{6,4}	t{4,6}	{4,6}	rr{6,4}	tr{6,4}
Uniform duals
V6^{4}	V4.12.12	V(4.6)^{2}	V6.8.8	V4^{6}	V4.4.4.6	V4.8.12
Alternations
[1^{+},6,4] (*443)	[6^{+},4] (6*2)	[6,1^{+},4] (*3222)	[6,4^{+}] (4*3)	[6,4,1^{+}] (*662)	[(6,4,2^{+})] (2*32)	[6,4]^{+} (642)
=	=	=	=	=	=	
h{6,4}	s{6,4}	hr{6,4}	s{4,6}	h{4,6}	hrr{6,4}	sr{6,4}

== See also ==
- Square tiling
- Uniform tilings in hyperbolic plane
- List of regular polytopes
