= Truncated order-6 square tiling =

Uniform tiling in geometry

Truncated order-6 square tiling
Poincaré disk model of the hyperbolic plane
Type	Hyperbolic uniform tiling
Vertex configuration	8.8.6
Schläfli symbol	t{4,6}
Wythoff symbol	2 6 | 4
Coxeter diagram	
Symmetry group	[6,4], (*642) [(3,3,4)], (*334)
Dual	Order-4 hexakis hexagonal tiling
Properties	Vertex-transitive

In geometry, the truncated order-6 square tiling is a uniform tiling of the hyperbolic plane. It has Schläfli symbol of t{4,6}.

== Uniform colorings ==
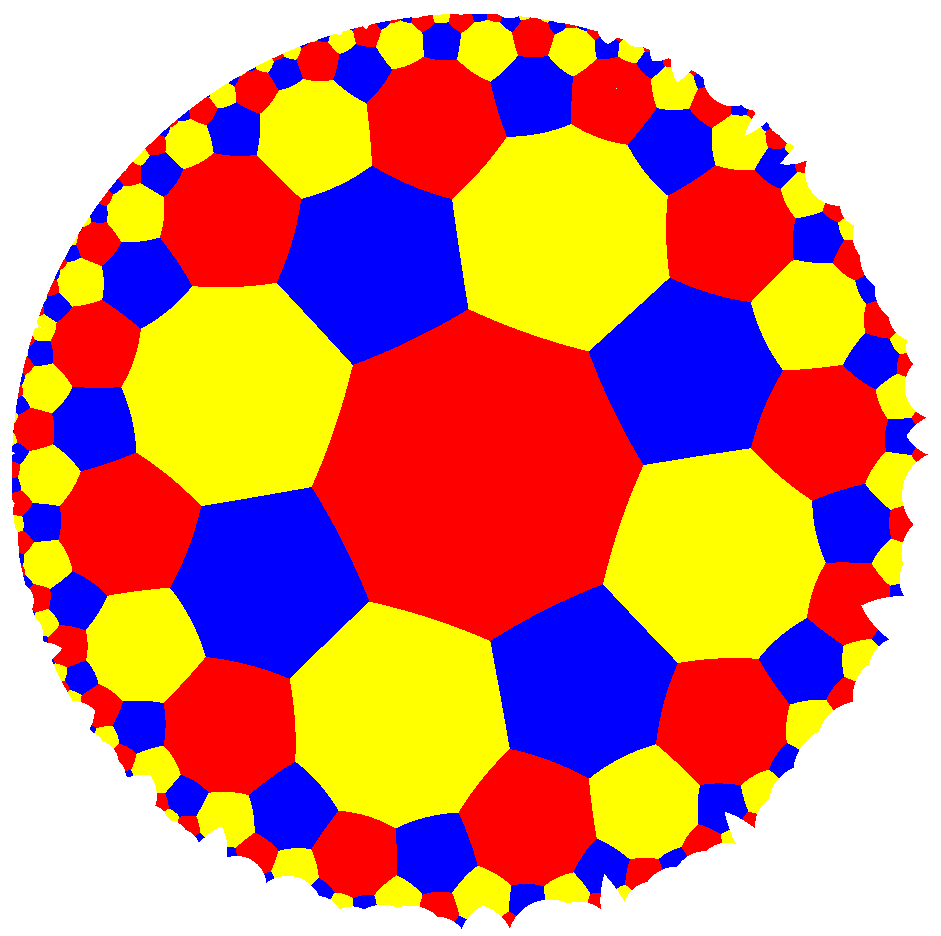
The half symmetry [1^{+},6,4] = [(4,4,3)] can be shown with alternating two colors of octagons, with as Coxeter diagram.

== Symmetry ==
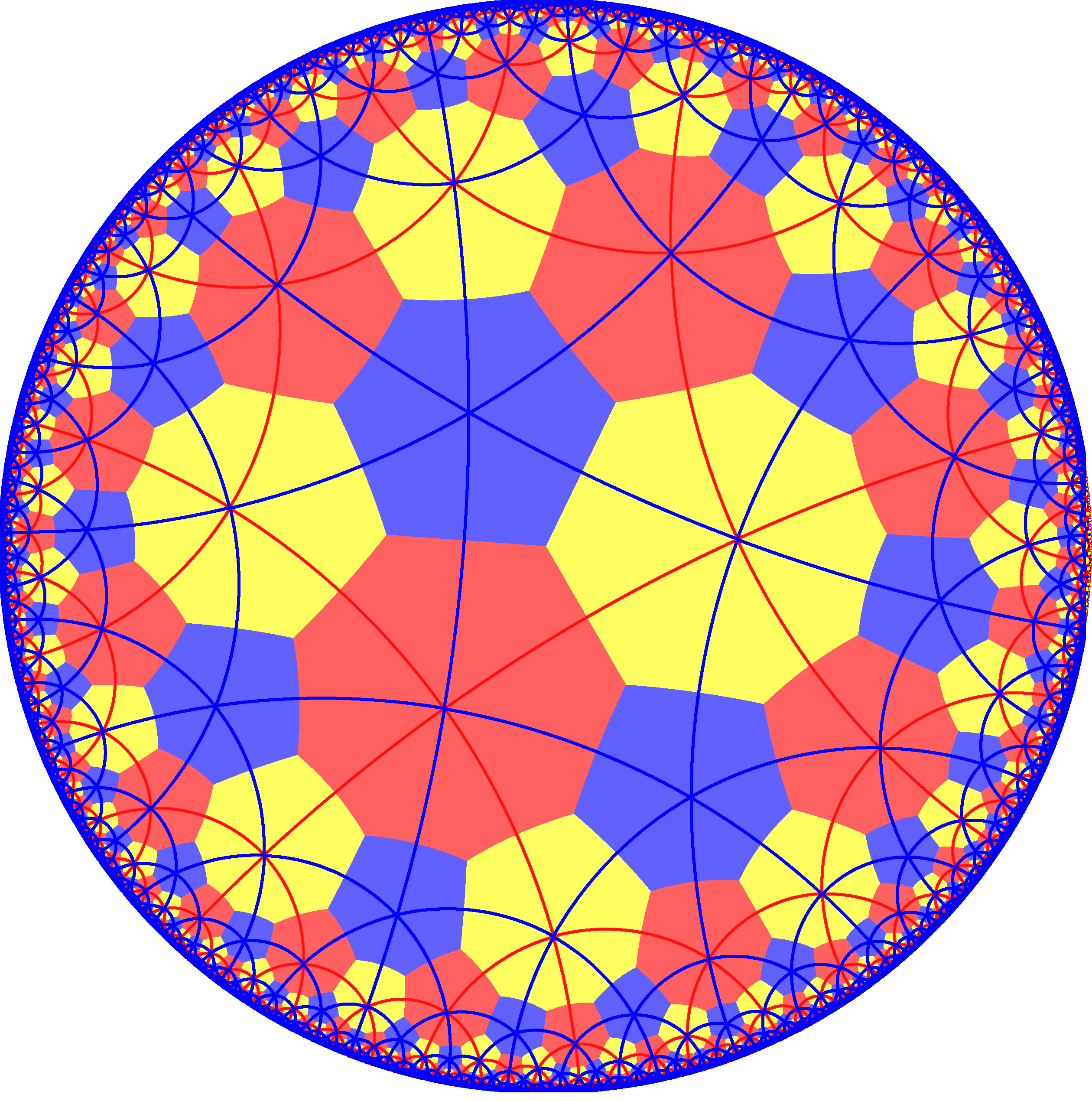
Truncated order-6 square tiling with *443 symmetry mirror lines

The dual tiling represents the fundamental domains of the *443 orbifold symmetry. There are two reflective subgroup kaleidoscopic constructed from [(4,4,3)] by removing one or two of three mirrors. In these images fundamental domains are alternately colored black and cyan, and mirrors exist on the boundaries between colors.

A larger subgroup is constructed [(4,4,3*)], index 6, as (3*22) with gyration points removed, becomes (*222222).

The symmetry can be doubled as 642 symmetry by adding a mirror bisecting the fundamental domain.

Small index subgroups of [(4,4,3)] (*443)
Index	1	2		6
Diagram				
Coxeter (orbifold)	[(4,4,3)] = (*443)	[(4,1^{+},4,3)] = = (*3232)	[(4,4,3^{+})] = (3*22)	[(4,4,3*)] = (*222222)
Direct subgroups
Index	2	4		12
Diagram				
Coxeter (orbifold)	[(4,4,3)]^{+} = (443)	[(4,4,3^{+})]^{+} = = (3232)		[(4,4,3*)]^{+} = (222222)

== Related polyhedra and tilings ==
From a Wythoff construction there are eight hyperbolic uniform tilings that can be based from the regular order-4 hexagonal tiling.

Drawing the tiles colored as red on the original faces, yellow at the original vertices, and blue along the original edges, there are 8 forms.

Uniform tetrahexagonal tilings
Symmetry: [6,4], (*642) (with [6,6] (*662), [(4,3,3)] (*443) , [∞,3,∞] (*3222) index 2 subsymmetries) (And [(∞,3,∞,3)] (*3232) index 4 subsymmetry)
= = =	=	= = =	=	= = =	=	
{6,4}	t{6,4}	r{6,4}	t{4,6}	{4,6}	rr{6,4}	tr{6,4}
Uniform duals
V6^{4}	V4.12.12	V(4.6)^{2}	V6.8.8	V4^{6}	V4.4.4.6	V4.8.12
Alternations
[1^{+},6,4] (*443)	[6^{+},4] (6*2)	[6,1^{+},4] (*3222)	[6,4^{+}] (4*3)	[6,4,1^{+}] (*662)	[(6,4,2^{+})] (2*32)	[6,4]^{+} (642)
=	=	=	=	=	=	
h{6,4}	s{6,4}	hr{6,4}	s{4,6}	h{4,6}	hrr{6,4}	sr{6,4}

It can also be generated from the (4 4 3) hyperbolic tilings:

Uniform (4,4,3) tilings
Symmetry: [(4,4,3)] (*443)							[(4,4,3)]^{+} (443)	[(4,4,3^{+})] (3*22)	[(4,1^{+},4,3)] (*3232)	
h{6,4} t_{0}(4,4,3)	h_{2}{6,4} t_{0,1}(4,4,3)	{4,6}^{1}/_{2} t_{1}(4,4,3)	h_{2}{6,4} t_{1,2}(4,4,3)	h{6,4} t_{2}(4,4,3)	r{6,4}^{1}/_{2} t_{0,2}(4,4,3)	t{4,6}^{1}/_{2} t_{0,1,2}(4,4,3)	s{4,6}^{1}/_{2} s(4,4,3)	hr{4,6}^{1}/_{2} hr(4,3,4)	h{4,6}^{1}/_{2} h(4,3,4)	q{4,6} h_{1}(4,3,4)
Uniform duals
V(3.4)^{4}	V3.8.4.8	V(4.4)^{3}	V3.8.4.8	V(3.4)^{4}	V4.6.4.6	V6.8.8	V3.3.3.4.3.4	V(4.4.3)^{2}	V6^{6}	V4.3.4.6.6

*n42 symmetry mutation of truncated tilings: n.8.8
Symmetry *n42 [n,4]	Spherical		Euclidean	Compact hyperbolic				Paracompact
Symmetry *n42 [n,4]	*242 [2,4]	*342 [3,4]	*442 [4,4]	*542 [5,4]	*642 [6,4]	*742 [7,4]	*842 [8,4]...	*∞42 [∞,4]
Truncated figures								
Config.	2.8.8	3.8.8	4.8.8	5.8.8	6.8.8	7.8.8	8.8.8	∞.8.8
n-kis figures								
Config.	V2.8.8	V3.8.8	V4.8.8	V5.8.8	V6.8.8	V7.8.8	V8.8.8	V∞.8.8

*n32 symmetry mutation of omnitruncated tilings: 6.8.2n
Sym. *n43 [(n,4,3)]	Spherical	Compact hyperbolic						Paraco.
Sym. *n43 [(n,4,3)]	*243 [4,3]	*343 [(3,4,3)]	*443 [(4,4,3)]	*543 [(5,4,3)]	*643 [(6,4,3)]	*743 [(7,4,3)]	*843 [(8,4,3)]	*∞43 [(∞,4,3)]
Figures								
Config.	4.8.6	6.8.6	8.8.6	10.8.6	12.8.6	14.8.6	16.8.6	∞.8.6
Duals								
Config.	V4.8.6	V6.8.6	V8.8.6	V10.8.6	V12.8.6	V14.8.6	V16.8.6	V6.8.∞

== See also ==
- Square tiling
- Tilings of regular polygons
- List of uniform planar tilings
- List of regular polytopes
