= Snub tetrahexagonal tiling =

Pattern in hyperbolic geometry

Snub tetrahexagonal tiling
Poincaré disk model of the hyperbolic plane
Type	Hyperbolic uniform tiling
Vertex configuration	3.3.4.3.6
Schläfli symbol	sr{6,4} or $s\begin{Bmatrix} 6 \\ 4 \end{Bmatrix}$
Wythoff symbol	| 6 4 2
Coxeter diagram	or
Symmetry group	[6,4]^{+}, (642)
Dual	Order-6-4 floret pentagonal tiling
Properties	Vertex-transitive Chiral

In geometry, the snub tetrahexagonal tiling is a uniform tiling of the hyperbolic plane. It has Schläfli symbol of sr{6,4}.

== Images ==
Drawn in chiral pairs, with edges missing between black triangles:

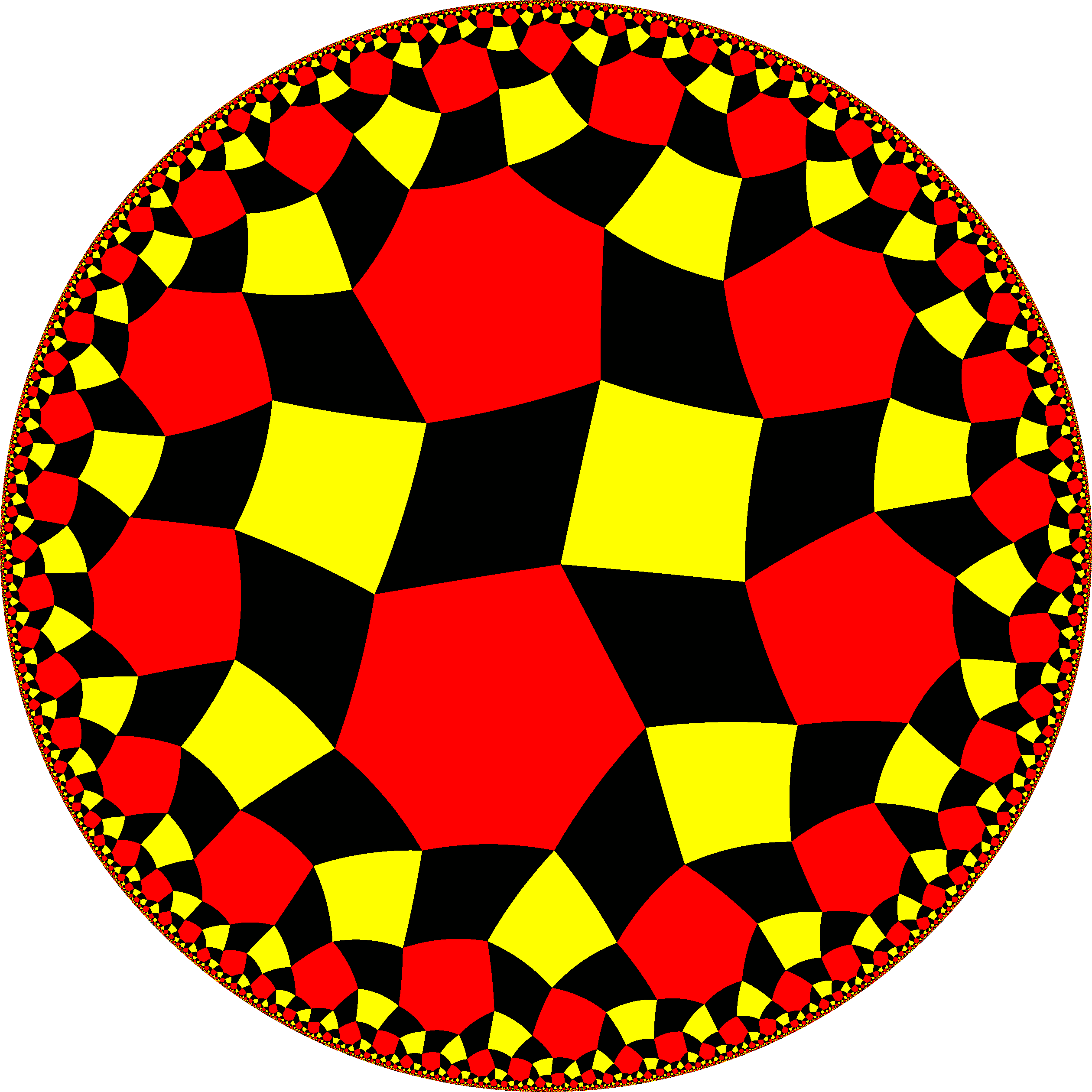
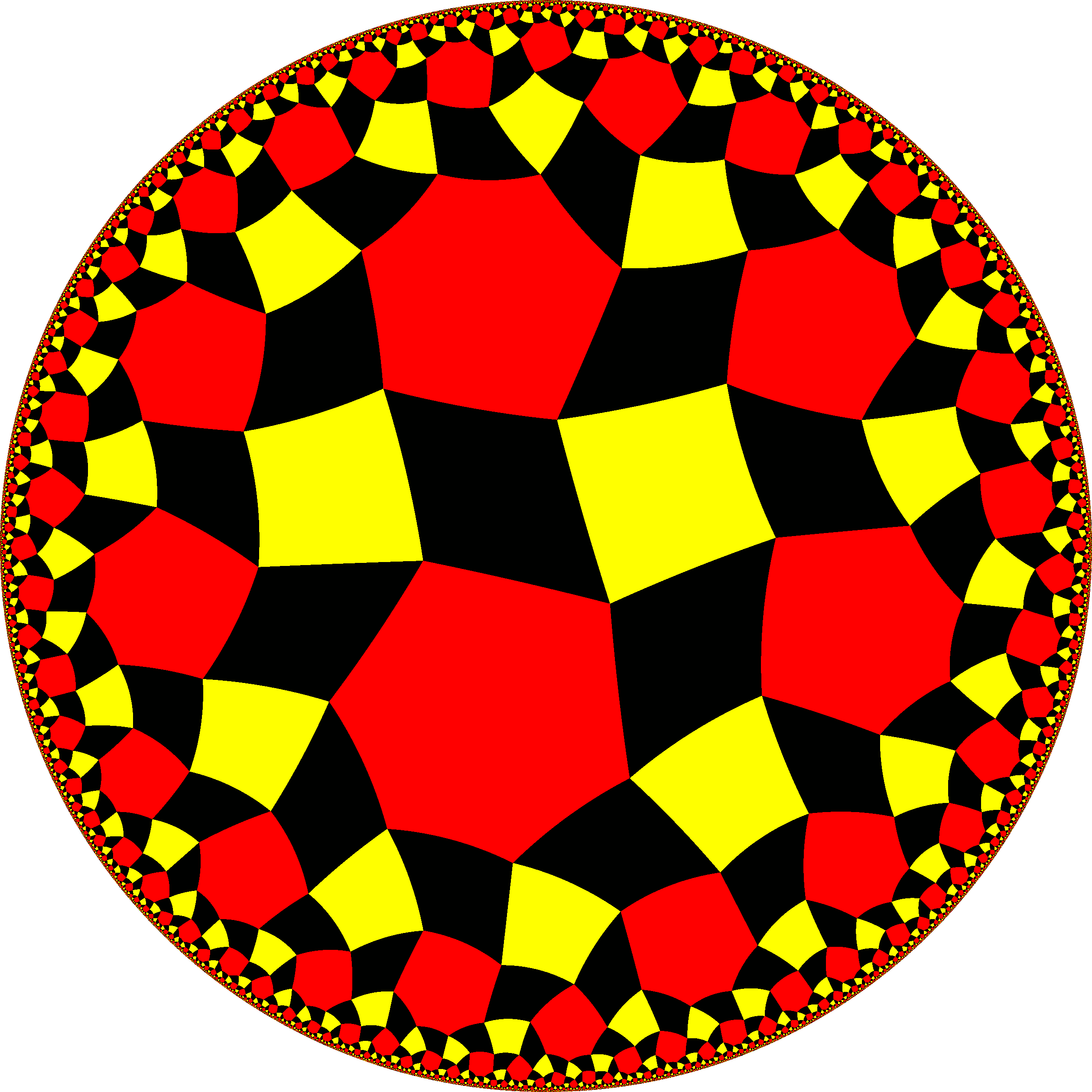

== Related polyhedra and tiling ==
The snub tetrahexagonal tiling is fifth in a series of snub polyhedra and tilings with vertex figure 3.3.4.3.n.

4n2 symmetry mutations of snub tilings: 3.3.4.3.n
Symmetry 4n2	Spherical		Euclidean	Compact hyperbolic				Paracomp.
Symmetry 4n2	242	342	442	542	642	742	842	∞42
Snub figures								
Config.	3.3.4.3.2	3.3.4.3.3	3.3.4.3.4	3.3.4.3.5	3.3.4.3.6	3.3.4.3.7	3.3.4.3.8	3.3.4.3.∞
Gyro figures								
Config.	V3.3.4.3.2	V3.3.4.3.3	V3.3.4.3.4	V3.3.4.3.5	V3.3.4.3.6	V3.3.4.3.7	V3.3.4.3.8	V3.3.4.3.∞

Uniform tetrahexagonal tilings
Symmetry: [6,4], (*642) (with [6,6] (*662), [(4,3,3)] (*443) , [∞,3,∞] (*3222) index 2 subsymmetries) (And [(∞,3,∞,3)] (*3232) index 4 subsymmetry)
= = =	=	= = =	=	= = =	=	
{6,4}	t{6,4}	r{6,4}	t{4,6}	{4,6}	rr{6,4}	tr{6,4}
Uniform duals
V6^{4}	V4.12.12	V(4.6)^{2}	V6.8.8	V4^{6}	V4.4.4.6	V4.8.12
Alternations
[1^{+},6,4] (*443)	[6^{+},4] (6*2)	[6,1^{+},4] (*3222)	[6,4^{+}] (4*3)	[6,4,1^{+}] (*662)	[(6,4,2^{+})] (2*32)	[6,4]^{+} (642)
=	=	=	=	=	=	
h{6,4}	s{6,4}	hr{6,4}	s{4,6}	h{4,6}	hrr{6,4}	sr{6,4}

== See also ==
- Square tiling
- Tilings of regular polygons
- List of uniform planar tilings
- List of regular polytopes
