= Truncated order-4 hexagonal tiling =

Pattern in hyperbolic geometry

Truncated order-4 hexagonal tiling
Poincaré disk model of the hyperbolic plane
| Type | Hyperbolic uniform tiling |
| Vertex configuration | 4.12.12 |
| Schläfli symbol | t{6,4} tr{6,6} or $t\begin{Bmatrix} 6 \\ 6 \end{Bmatrix}$ |
| Wythoff symbol | 2 4 | 6; 2 6 6 | |
| Coxeter diagram | or |
| Symmetry group | [6,4], (*642) [6,6], (*662) |
| Dual | Order-6 tetrakis square tiling |
| Properties | Vertex-transitive |

In geometry, the truncated order-4 hexagonal tiling is a uniform tiling of the hyperbolic plane. It has Schläfli symbol of t{6,4}. A secondary construction tr{6,6} is called a truncated hexahexagonal tiling with two colors of dodecagons.

== Constructions ==
There are two uniform constructions of this tiling, first from [6,4] kaleidoscope, and a lower symmetry by removing the last mirror, [6,4,1^{+}], gives [6,6], (*662).

Two uniform constructions of 4.6.4.6
| Name | Tetrahexagonal | Truncated hexahexagonal |
|---|---|---|
| Image | | |
| Symmetry | [6,4] (*642) | [6,6] = [6,4,1^{+}] (*662) = |
| Symbol | t{6,4} | tr{6,6} |
| Coxeter diagram | | |

== Dual tiling ==
The dual tiling, order-6 tetrakis square tiling has face configuration V4.12.12, and represents the fundamental domains of the [6,6] symmetry group.

== Related polyhedra and tiling ==
*n42 symmetry mutation of truncated tilings: 4.2n.2n
| Symmetry *n42 [n,4] | Spherical | | Euclidean | Compact hyperbolic | | | | Paracomp. |
| Symmetry *n42 [n,4] | *242 [2,4] | *342 [3,4] | *442 [4,4] | *542 [5,4] | *642 [6,4] | *742 [7,4] | *842 [8,4]... | *∞42 [∞,4] |
|---|---|---|---|---|---|---|---|---|
| Truncated figures | | | | | | | | |
| Config. | 4.4.4 | 4.6.6 | 4.8.8 | 4.10.10 | 4.12.12 | 4.14.14 | 4.16.16 | 4.∞.∞ |
| n-kis figures | | | | | | | | |
| Config. | V4.4.4 | V4.6.6 | V4.8.8 | V4.10.10 | V4.12.12 | V4.14.14 | V4.16.16 | V4.∞.∞ |

Uniform tetrahexagonal tilings
Symmetry: [6,4], (*642) (with [6,6] (*662), [(4,3,3)] (*443) , [∞,3,∞] (*3222) index 2 subsymmetries) (And [(∞,3,∞,3)] (*3232) index 4 subsymmetry)
| = = = | = | = = = | = | = = = | = | |
| {6,4} | t{6,4} | r{6,4} | t{4,6} | {4,6} | rr{6,4} | tr{6,4} |
Uniform duals
| V6^{4} | V4.12.12 | V(4.6)^{2} | V6.8.8 | V4^{6} | V4.4.4.6 | V4.8.12 |
Alternations
| [1^{+},6,4] (*443) | [6^{+},4] (6*2) | [6,1^{+},4] (*3222) | [6,4^{+}] (4*3) | [6,4,1^{+}] (*662) | [(6,4,2^{+})] (2*32) | [6,4]^{+} (642) |
| = | = | = | = | = | = | |
| h{6,4} | s{6,4} | hr{6,4} | s{4,6} | h{4,6} | hrr{6,4} | sr{6,4} |

Uniform hexahexagonal tilings
Symmetry: [6,6], (*662)
| = = | = = | = = | = = | = = | = = | = = |
| {6,6} = h{4,6} | t{6,6} = h_{2}{4,6} | r{6,6} {6,4} | t{6,6} = h_{2}{4,6} | {6,6} = h{4,6} | rr{6,6} r{6,4} | tr{6,6} t{6,4} |
Uniform duals
| V6^{6} | V6.12.12 | V6.6.6.6 | V6.12.12 | V6^{6} | V4.6.4.6 | V4.12.12 |
Alternations
| [1^{+},6,6] (*663) | [6^{+},6] (6*3) | [6,1^{+},6] (*3232) | [6,6^{+}] (6*3) | [6,6,1^{+}] (*663) | [(6,6,2^{+})] (2*33) | [6,6]^{+} (662) |
| = | | = | | = | | |
| h{6,6} | s{6,6} | hr{6,6} | s{6,6} | h{6,6} | hrr{6,6} | sr{6,6} |

=== Symmetry ===
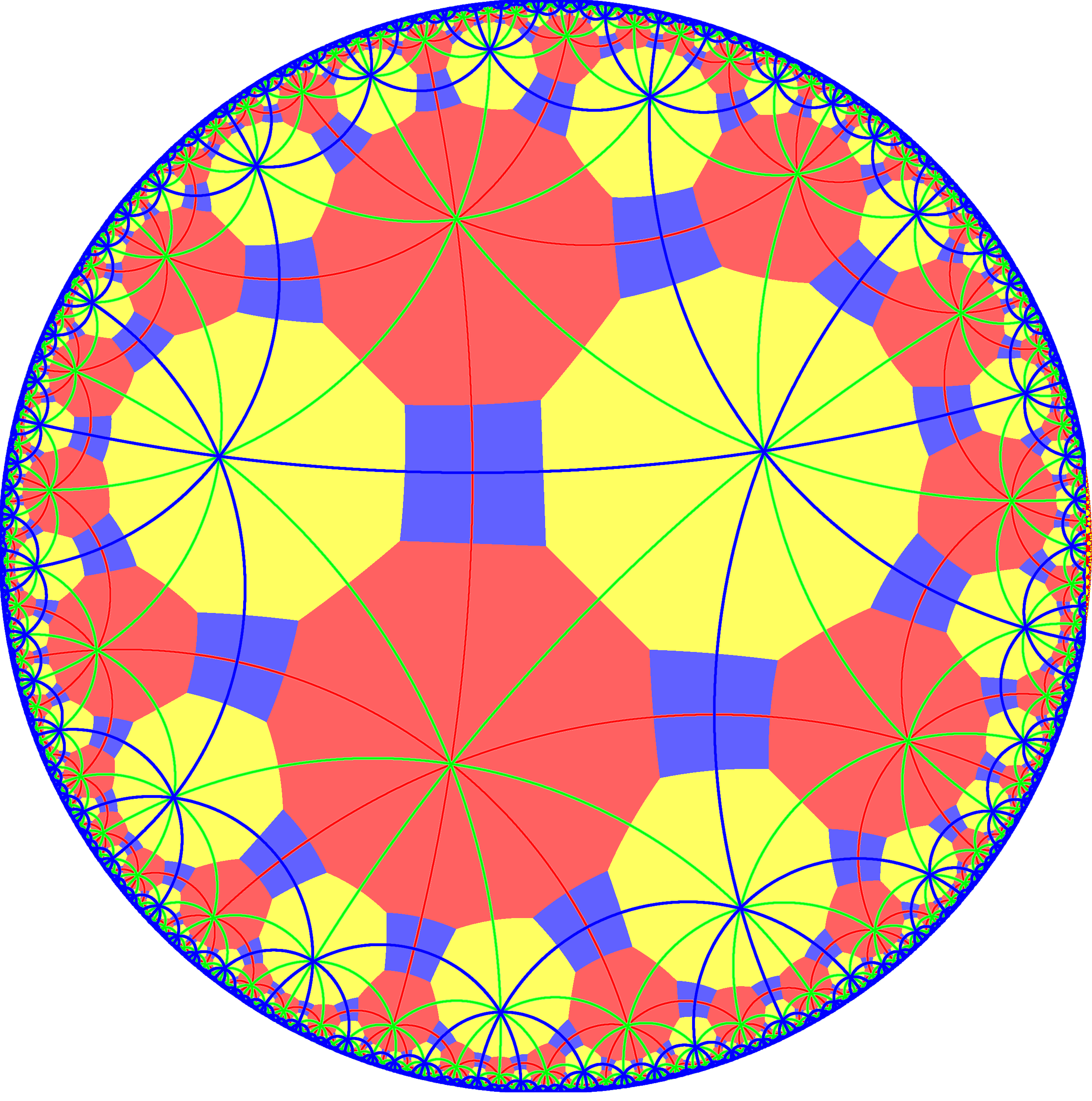
Truncated order-4 hexagonal tiling with *662 mirror lines

The dual of the tiling represents the fundamental domains of (*662) orbifold symmetry. From [6,6] (*662) symmetry, there are 15 small index subgroup (12 unique) by mirror removal and alternation operators. Mirrors can be removed if its branch orders are all even, and cuts neighboring branch orders in half. Removing two mirrors leaves a half-order gyration point where the removed mirrors met. In these images fundamental domains are alternately colored black and white, and mirrors exist on the boundaries between colors. The subgroup index-8 group, [1^{+},6,1^{+},6,1^{+}] (3333) is the commutator subgroup of [6,6].

Larger subgroup constructed as [6,6^{*}], removing the gyration points of (6*3), index 12 becomes (*333333).

The symmetry can be doubled to 642 symmetry by adding a mirror to bisect the fundamental domain.

Small index subgroups of [6,6] (*662)
| Index | 1 | 2 | | | 4 | |
|---|---|---|---|---|---|---|
| Diagram | | | | | | |
| Coxeter | [6,6] | [1^{+},6,6] = | [6,6,1^{+}] = | [6,1^{+},6] = | [1^{+},6,6,1^{+}] = | [6^{+},6^{+}] |
| Orbifold | *662 | *663 | | *3232 | *3333 | 33× |
Direct subgroups
| Diagram | | | | | | |
| Coxeter | | [6,6^{+}] | [6^{+},6] | [(6,6,2^{+})] | [6,1^{+},6,1^{+}] = = = = | [1^{+},6,1^{+},6] = = = = |
| Orbifold | | 6*3 | | 2*33 | 3*33 | |
Direct subgroups
| Index | 2 | 4 | | | 8 | |
| Diagram | | | | | | |
| Coxeter | [6,6]^{+} | [6,6^{+}]^{+} = | [6^{+},6]^{+} = | [6,1^{+},6]^{+} = | [6^{+},6^{+}]^{+} = [1^{+},6,1^{+},6]^{+} = = = | |
| Orbifold | 662 | 663 | | 3232 | 3333 | |
Radical subgroups
| Index | | 12 | | 24 | | |
| Diagram | | | | | | |
| Coxeter | | [6,6*] | [6*,6] | [6,6*]^{+} | [6*,6]^{+} | |
| Orbifold | | *333333 | | 333333 | | |

== See also ==
- Square tiling
- Tilings of regular polygons
- List of uniform planar tilings
- List of regular polytopes
