= Alternated order-4 hexagonal tiling =

Uniform tiling of the hyperbolic plane

Alternated order-4 hexagonal tiling
Poincaré disk model of the hyperbolic plane
Type	Hyperbolic uniform tiling
Vertex configuration	(3.4)^{4}
Schläfli symbol	h{6,4} or (3,4,4)
Wythoff symbol	4 | 3 4
Coxeter diagram	or
Symmetry group	[(4,4,3)], (*443)
Dual	Order-4-4-3_t0 dual tiling
Properties	Vertex-transitive

In geometry, the alternated order-4 hexagonal tiling is a uniform tiling of the hyperbolic plane. It has Schläfli symbol of (3,4,4), h{6,4}, and hr{6,6}.

== Uniform constructions ==
There are four uniform constructions, with some of lower ones which can be seen with two colors of triangles:

*443	3333	*3232	3*22
=	=	= =	=
(4,4,3) = h{6,4}		hr{6,6} = h{6,4}1/2	

== Related polyhedra and tiling ==
Uniform tetrahexagonal tilings
Symmetry: [6,4], (*642) (with [6,6] (*662), [(4,3,3)] (*443) , [∞,3,∞] (*3222) index 2 subsymmetries) (And [(∞,3,∞,3)] (*3232) index 4 subsymmetry)
= = =	=	= = =	=	= = =	=	
{6,4}	t{6,4}	r{6,4}	t{4,6}	{4,6}	rr{6,4}	tr{6,4}
Uniform duals
V6^{4}	V4.12.12	V(4.6)^{2}	V6.8.8	V4^{6}	V4.4.4.6	V4.8.12
Alternations
[1^{+},6,4] (*443)	[6^{+},4] (6*2)	[6,1^{+},4] (*3222)	[6,4^{+}] (4*3)	[6,4,1^{+}] (*662)	[(6,4,2^{+})] (2*32)	[6,4]^{+} (642)
=	=	=	=	=	=	
h{6,4}	s{6,4}	hr{6,4}	s{4,6}	h{4,6}	hrr{6,4}	sr{6,4}

Uniform hexahexagonal tilings
Symmetry: [6,6], (*662)
= =	= =	= =	= =	= =	= =	= =
{6,6} = h{4,6}	t{6,6} = h_{2}{4,6}	r{6,6} {6,4}	t{6,6} = h_{2}{4,6}	{6,6} = h{4,6}	rr{6,6} r{6,4}	tr{6,6} t{6,4}
Uniform duals
V6^{6}	V6.12.12	V6.6.6.6	V6.12.12	V6^{6}	V4.6.4.6	V4.12.12
Alternations
[1^{+},6,6] (*663)	[6^{+},6] (6*3)	[6,1^{+},6] (*3232)	[6,6^{+}] (6*3)	[6,6,1^{+}] (*663)	[(6,6,2^{+})] (2*33)	[6,6]^{+} (662)
=		=		=		
h{6,6}	s{6,6}	hr{6,6}	s{6,6}	h{6,6}	hrr{6,6}	sr{6,6}

Uniform (4,4,3) tilings
Symmetry: [(4,4,3)] (*443)							[(4,4,3)]^{+} (443)	[(4,4,3^{+})] (3*22)	[(4,1^{+},4,3)] (*3232)	
h{6,4} t_{0}(4,4,3)	h_{2}{6,4} t_{0,1}(4,4,3)	{4,6}^{1}/_{2} t_{1}(4,4,3)	h_{2}{6,4} t_{1,2}(4,4,3)	h{6,4} t_{2}(4,4,3)	r{6,4}^{1}/_{2} t_{0,2}(4,4,3)	t{4,6}^{1}/_{2} t_{0,1,2}(4,4,3)	s{4,6}^{1}/_{2} s(4,4,3)	hr{4,6}^{1}/_{2} hr(4,3,4)	h{4,6}^{1}/_{2} h(4,3,4)	q{4,6} h_{1}(4,3,4)
Uniform duals
V(3.4)^{4}	V3.8.4.8	V(4.4)^{3}	V3.8.4.8	V(3.4)^{4}	V4.6.4.6	V6.8.8	V3.3.3.4.3.4	V(4.4.3)^{2}	V6^{6}	V4.3.4.6.6

Similar H2 tilings in *3232 symmetry
Coxeter diagrams				
Vertex figure	6^{6}	(3.4.3.4)^{2}	3.4.6.6.4	6.4.6.4
Image				
Dual				

== See also ==
- Square tiling
- Uniform tilings in hyperbolic plane
- List of regular polytopes
