= Quarter order-6 square tiling =

Hyperbolic tiling with square faces

Quarter order-6 square tiling
Poincaré disk model of the hyperbolic plane
| Type | Hyperbolic uniform tiling |
| Vertex figure | 3.4.6.6.4 |
| Schläfli symbol | q{4,6} |
| Coxeter diagram | = = = or or or |
| Dual | ? |
| Properties | Vertex-transitive |

In geometry, the quarter order-6 square tiling is a uniform tiling of the hyperbolic plane. It has Schläfli symbol of q{4,6}. It is constructed from *3232 orbifold notation, and can be seen as a half symmetry of *443 and *662, and quarter symmetry of *642.

== Images ==
Projections centered on a vertex, triangle and hexagon:

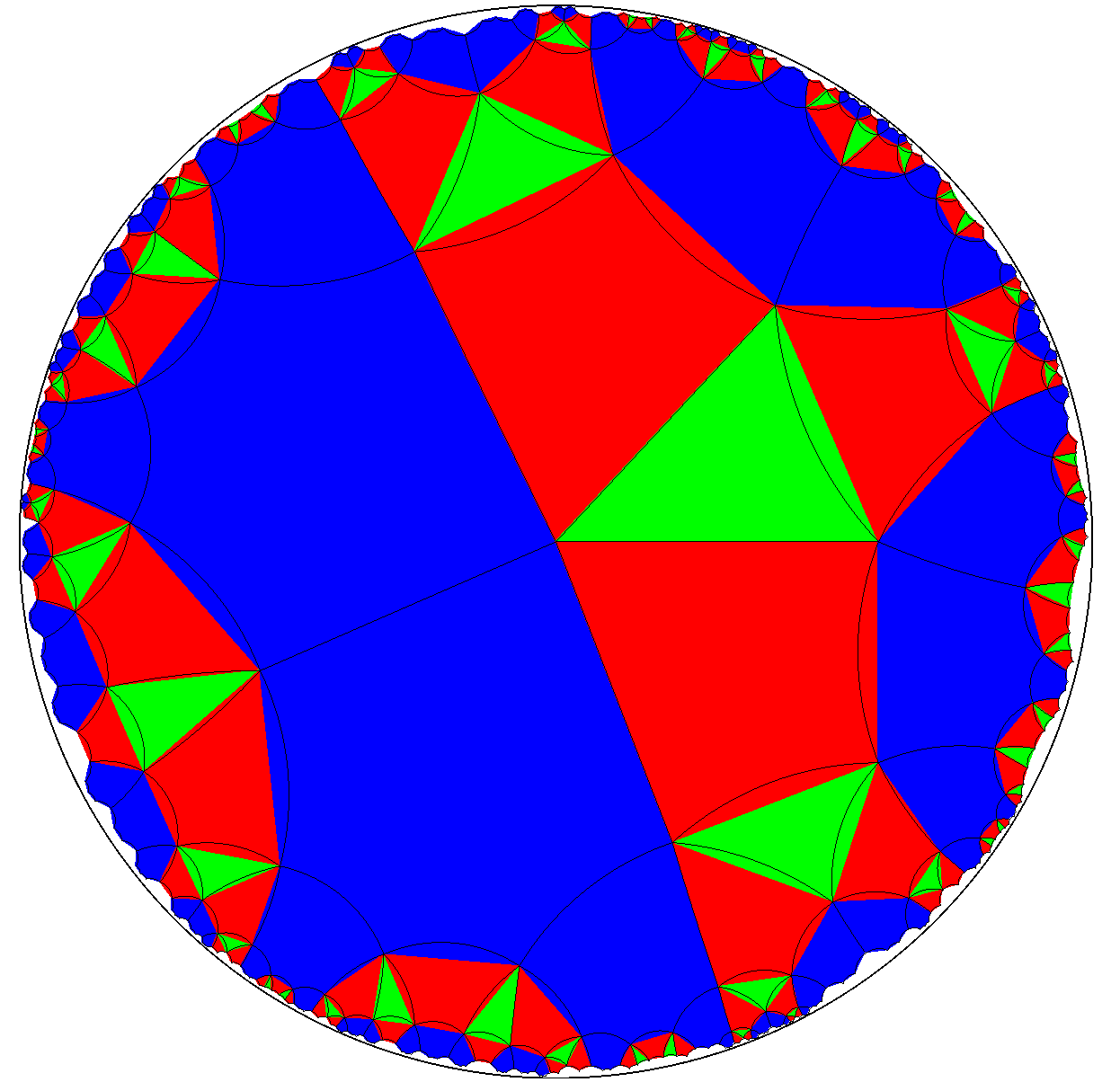
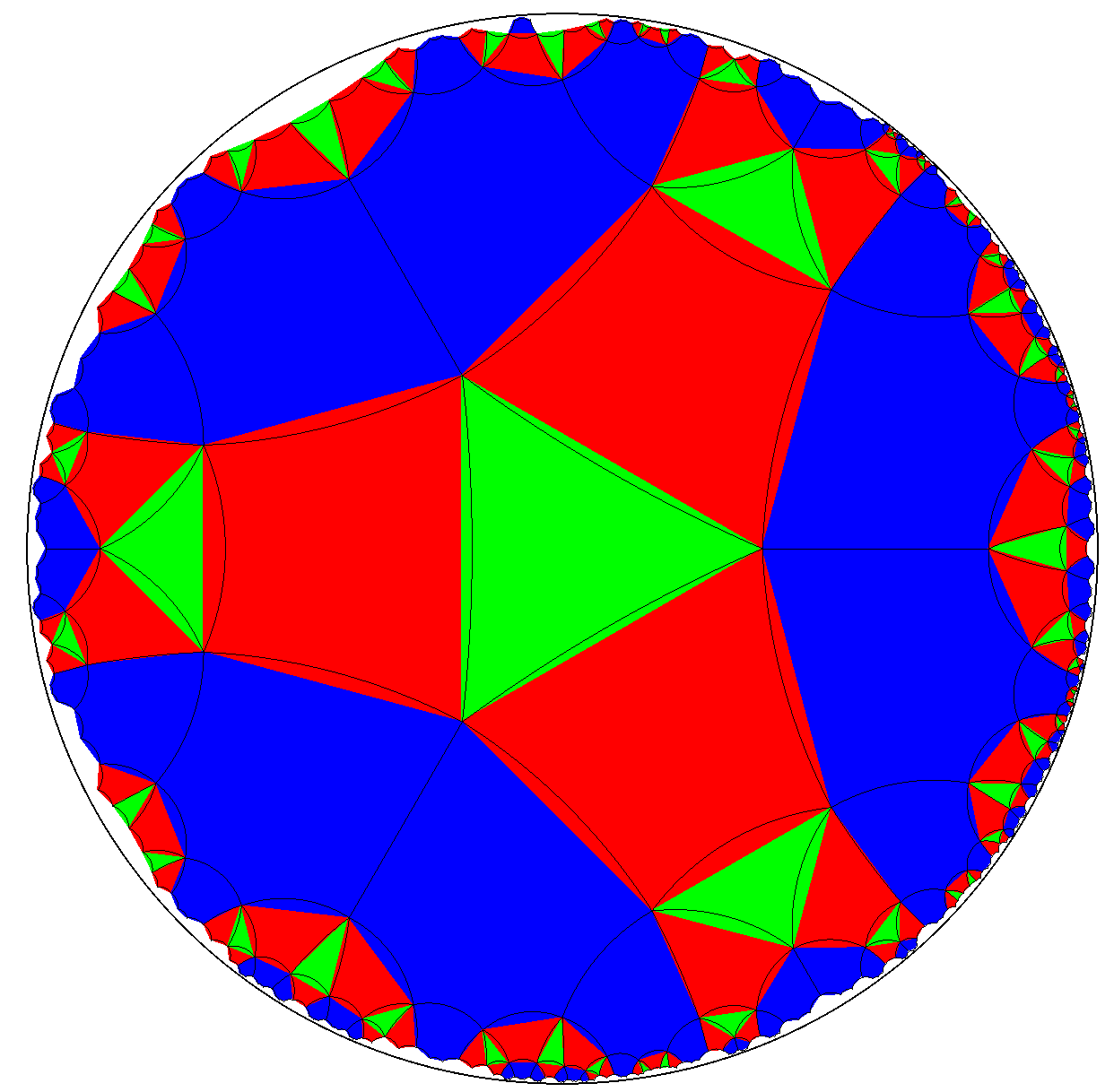
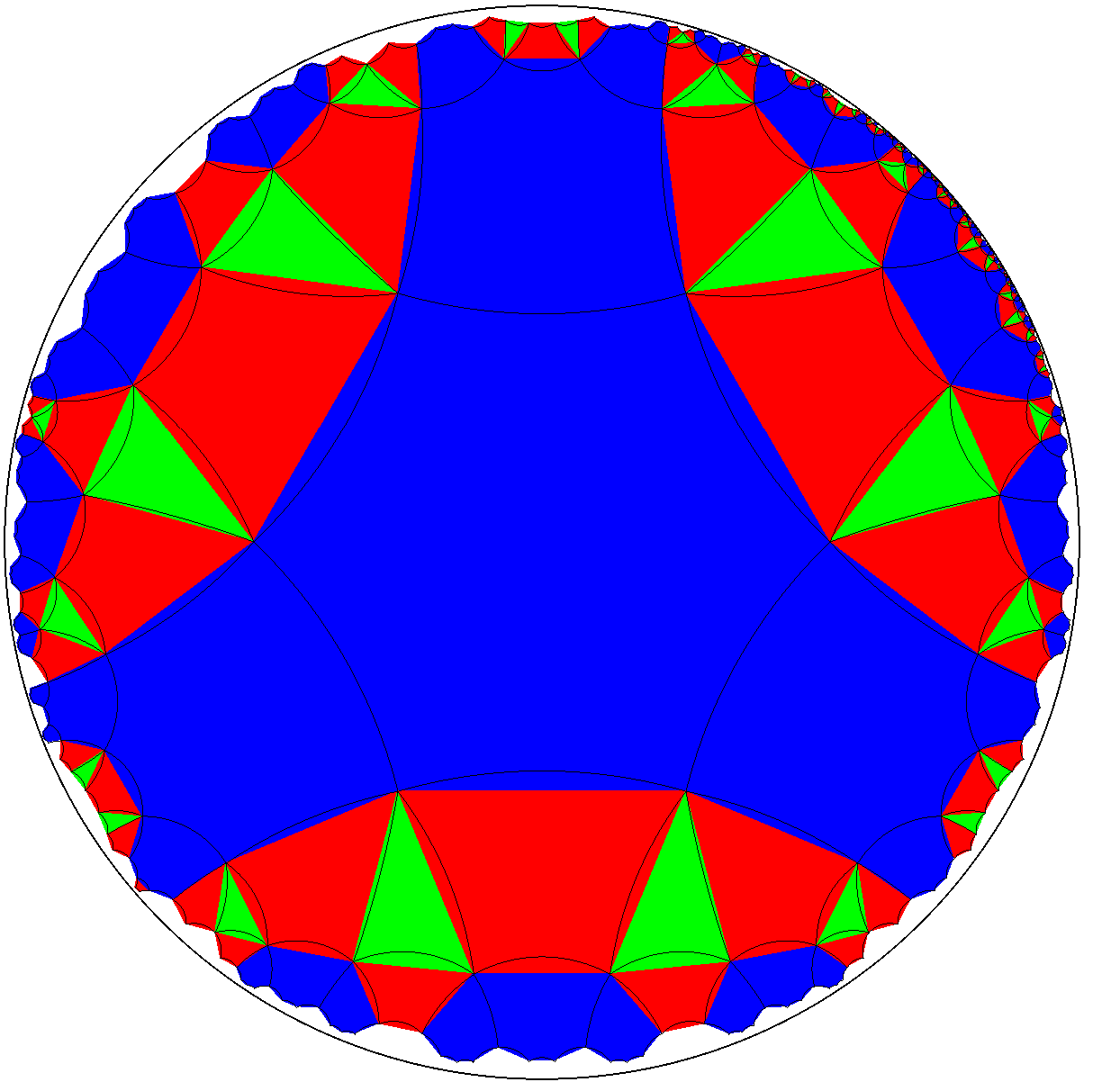

== Related polyhedra and tiling ==
Similar H2 tilings in *3232 symmetry
| Coxeter diagrams | | | | |
| Vertex figure | 6^{6} | (3.4.3.4)^{2} | 3.4.6.6.4 | 6.4.6.4 |
| Image | | | | |
| Dual | | | | |

Uniform (4,4,3) tilings
| Symmetry: [(4,4,3)] (*443) | | | | | | | [(4,4,3)]^{+} (443) | [(4,4,3^{+})] (3*22) | [(4,1^{+},4,3)] (*3232) | |
|---|---|---|---|---|---|---|---|---|---|---|
| h{6,4} t_{0}(4,4,3) | h_{2}{6,4} t_{0,1}(4,4,3) | {4,6}^{1}/_{2} t_{1}(4,4,3) | h_{2}{6,4} t_{1,2}(4,4,3) | h{6,4} t_{2}(4,4,3) | r{6,4}^{1}/_{2} t_{0,2}(4,4,3) | t{4,6}^{1}/_{2} t_{0,1,2}(4,4,3) | s{4,6}^{1}/_{2} s(4,4,3) | hr{4,6}^{1}/_{2} hr(4,3,4) | h{4,6}^{1}/_{2} h(4,3,4) | q{4,6} h_{1}(4,3,4) |
Uniform duals
| V(3.4)^{4} | V3.8.4.8 | V(4.4)^{3} | V3.8.4.8 | V(3.4)^{4} | V4.6.4.6 | V6.8.8 | V3.3.3.4.3.4 | V(4.4.3)^{2} | V6^{6} | V4.3.4.6.6 |

== See also ==
- Square tiling
- Tilings of regular polygons
- List of uniform planar tilings
- List of regular polytopes
