= Tetrahexagonal tiling =

Uniform tiling of the hyperbolic plane

Tetrahexagonal tiling
Poincaré disk model of the hyperbolic plane
Type	Hyperbolic uniform tiling
Vertex configuration	(4.6)^{2}
Schläfli symbol	r{6,4} or $\begin{Bmatrix} 6 \\ 4 \end{Bmatrix}$ rr{6,6} r(4,4,3) t_{0,1,2,3}(∞,3,∞,3)
Wythoff symbol	2 | 6 4
Coxeter diagram	or or
Symmetry group	[6,4], (*642) [6,6], (*662) [(4,4,3)], (*443) [(∞,3,∞,3)], (*3232)
Dual	Order-6-4 quasiregular rhombic tiling
Properties	Vertex-transitive edge-transitive

In geometry, the tetrahexagonal tiling is a uniform tiling of the hyperbolic plane. It has Schläfli symbol r{6,4}.

== Constructions ==
There are for uniform constructions of this tiling, three of them as constructed by mirror removal from the [6,4] kaleidoscope. Removing the last mirror, [6,4,1^{+}], gives [6,6], (*662). Removing the first mirror [1^{+},6,4], gives [(4,4,3)], (*443). Removing both mirror as [1^{+},6,4,1^{+}], leaving [(3,∞,3,∞)] (*3232).

Four uniform constructions of 4.6.4.6
Uniform Coloring				
Fundamental Domains				
Schläfli	r{6,4}	r{4,6}1/2	r{6,4}1/2	r{6,4}1/4
Symmetry	[6,4] (*642)	[6,6] = [6,4,1^{+}] (*662)	[(4,4,3)] = [1^{+},6,4] (*443)	[(∞,3,∞,3)] = [1^{+},6,4,1^{+}] (*3232) or
Symbol	r{6,4}	rr{6,6}	r(4,3,4)	t_{0,1,2,3}(∞,3,∞,3)
Coxeter diagram		=	=	= or

== Symmetry ==
The dual tiling, called a rhombic tetrahexagonal tiling, with face configuration V4.6.4.6, and represents the fundamental domains of a quadrilateral kaleidoscope, orbifold (*3232), shown here in two different centered views. Adding a 2-fold rotation point in the center of each rhombi represents a (2*32) orbifold.

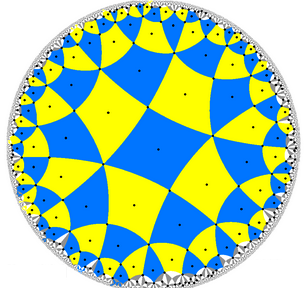
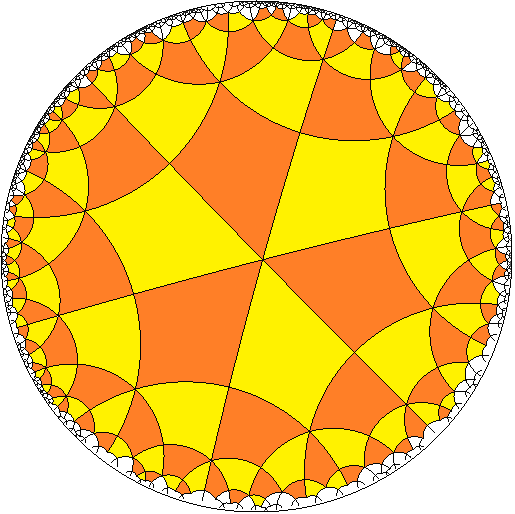
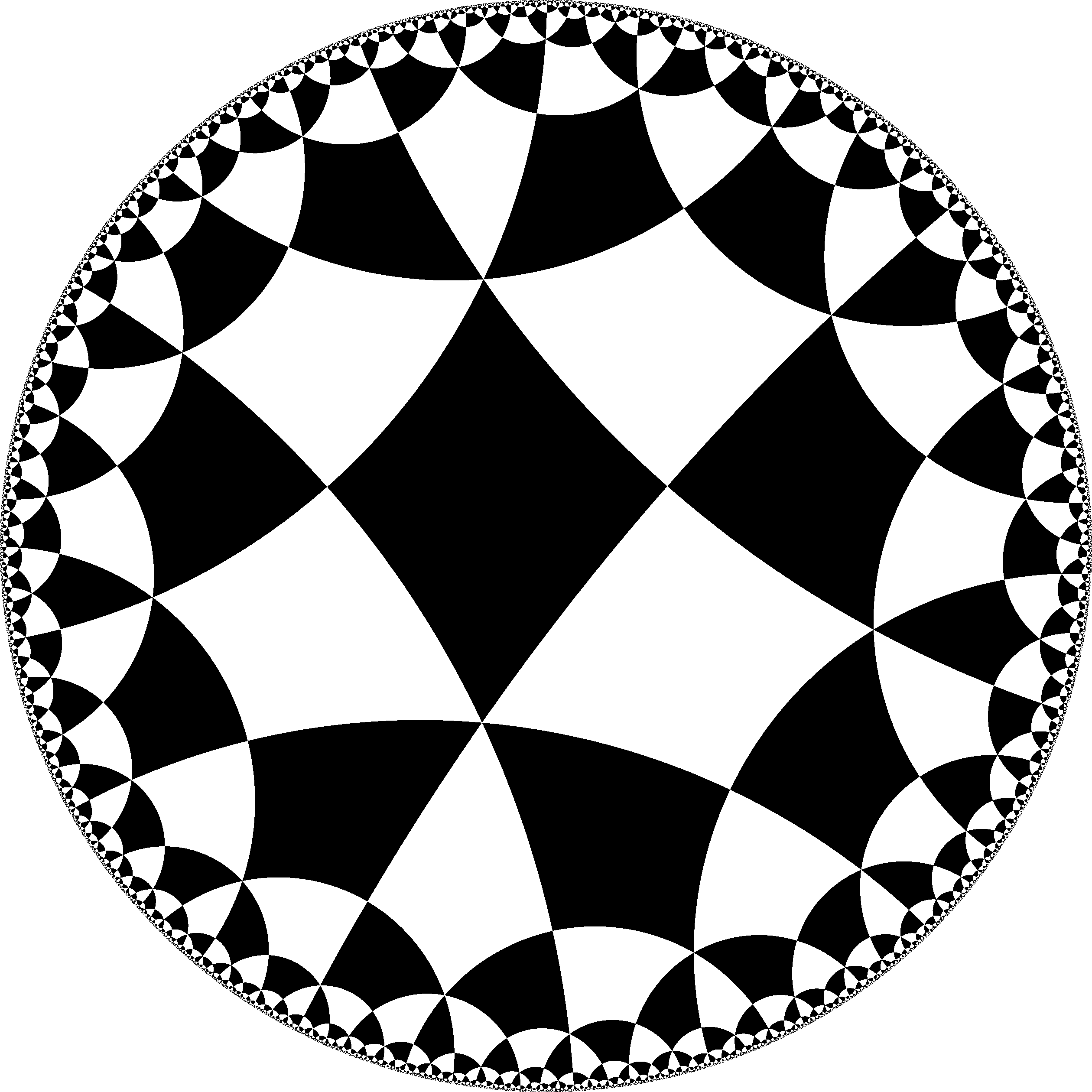
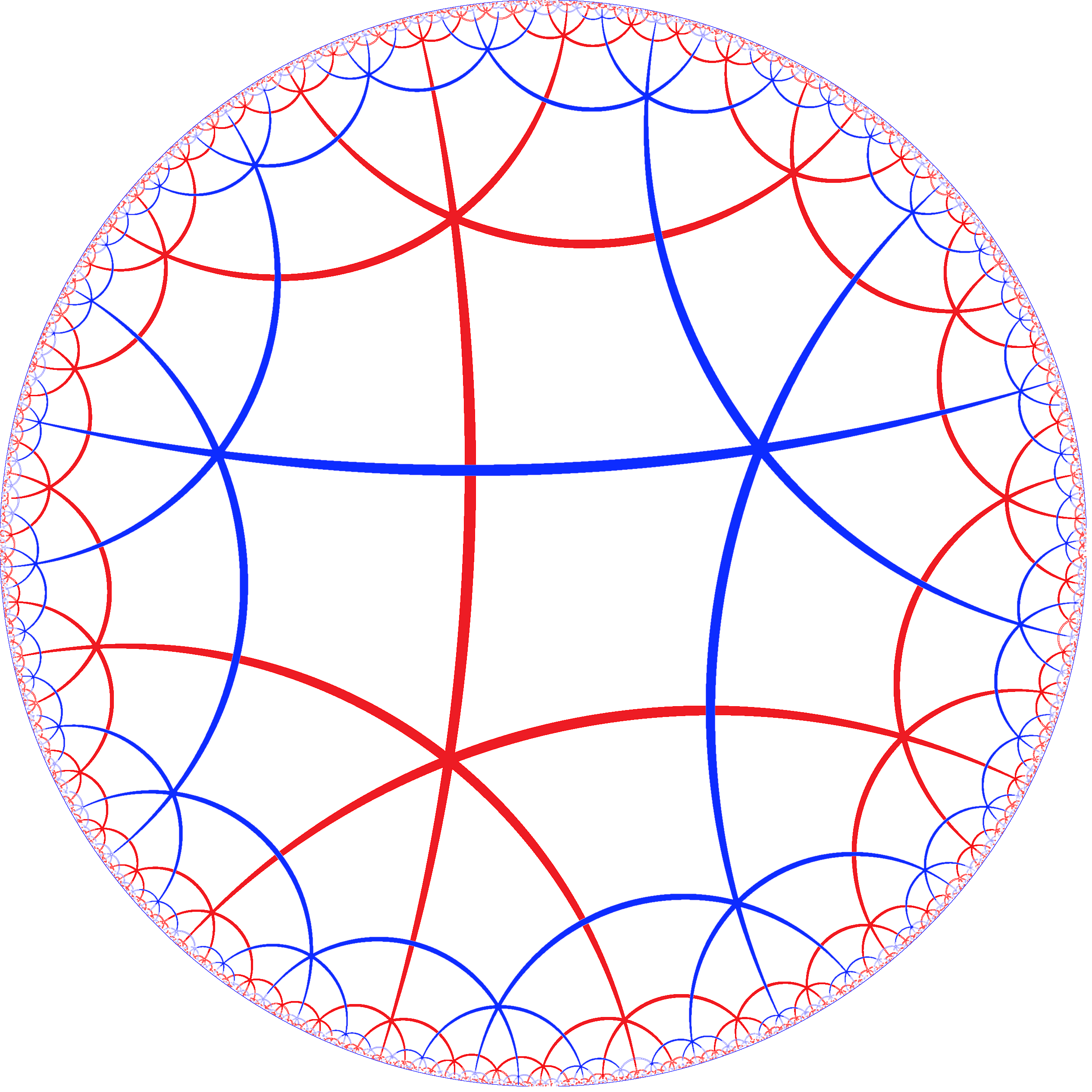

== Related polyhedra and tiling ==
*n42 symmetry mutations of quasiregular tilings: (4.n)^{2}
Symmetry *4n2 [n,4]	Spherical	Euclidean	Compact hyperbolic				Paracompact	Noncompact
Symmetry *4n2 [n,4]	*342 [3,4]	*442 [4,4]	*542 [5,4]	*642 [6,4]	*742 [7,4]	*842 [8,4]...	*∞42 [∞,4]	[ni,4]
Figures								
Config.	(4.3)^{2}	(4.4)^{2}	(4.5)^{2}	(4.6)^{2}	(4.7)^{2}	(4.8)^{2}	(4.∞)^{2}	(4.ni)^{2}

Symmetry mutation of quasiregular tilings: (6.n)^{2}
Symmetry *6n2 [n,6]	Euclidean	Compact hyperbolic					Paracompact	Noncompact
Symmetry *6n2 [n,6]	*632 [3,6]	*642 [4,6]	*652 [5,6]	*662 [6,6]	*762 [7,6]	*862 [8,6]...	*∞62 [∞,6]	[iπ/λ,6]
Quasiregular figures configuration	6.3.6.3	6.4.6.4	6.5.6.5	6.6.6.6	6.7.6.7	6.8.6.8	6.∞.6.∞	6.∞.6.∞
Dual figures
Rhombic figures configuration	V6.3.6.3	V6.4.6.4	V6.5.6.5	V6.6.6.6	V6.7.6.7	V6.8.6.8	V6.∞.6.∞	

Uniform tetrahexagonal tilings
Symmetry: [6,4], (*642) (with [6,6] (*662), [(4,3,3)] (*443) , [∞,3,∞] (*3222) index 2 subsymmetries) (And [(∞,3,∞,3)] (*3232) index 4 subsymmetry)
= = =	=	= = =	=	= = =	=	
{6,4}	t{6,4}	r{6,4}	t{4,6}	{4,6}	rr{6,4}	tr{6,4}
Uniform duals
V6^{4}	V4.12.12	V(4.6)^{2}	V6.8.8	V4^{6}	V4.4.4.6	V4.8.12
Alternations
[1^{+},6,4] (*443)	[6^{+},4] (6*2)	[6,1^{+},4] (*3222)	[6,4^{+}] (4*3)	[6,4,1^{+}] (*662)	[(6,4,2^{+})] (2*32)	[6,4]^{+} (642)
=	=	=	=	=	=	
h{6,4}	s{6,4}	hr{6,4}	s{4,6}	h{4,6}	hrr{6,4}	sr{6,4}

Uniform hexahexagonal tilings
Symmetry: [6,6], (*662)
= =	= =	= =	= =	= =	= =	= =
{6,6} = h{4,6}	t{6,6} = h_{2}{4,6}	r{6,6} {6,4}	t{6,6} = h_{2}{4,6}	{6,6} = h{4,6}	rr{6,6} r{6,4}	tr{6,6} t{6,4}
Uniform duals
V6^{6}	V6.12.12	V6.6.6.6	V6.12.12	V6^{6}	V4.6.4.6	V4.12.12
Alternations
[1^{+},6,6] (*663)	[6^{+},6] (6*3)	[6,1^{+},6] (*3232)	[6,6^{+}] (6*3)	[6,6,1^{+}] (*663)	[(6,6,2^{+})] (2*33)	[6,6]^{+} (662)
=		=		=		
h{6,6}	s{6,6}	hr{6,6}	s{6,6}	h{6,6}	hrr{6,6}	sr{6,6}

Uniform (4,4,3) tilings
Symmetry: [(4,4,3)] (*443)							[(4,4,3)]^{+} (443)	[(4,4,3^{+})] (3*22)	[(4,1^{+},4,3)] (*3232)	
h{6,4} t_{0}(4,4,3)	h_{2}{6,4} t_{0,1}(4,4,3)	{4,6}^{1}/_{2} t_{1}(4,4,3)	h_{2}{6,4} t_{1,2}(4,4,3)	h{6,4} t_{2}(4,4,3)	r{6,4}^{1}/_{2} t_{0,2}(4,4,3)	t{4,6}^{1}/_{2} t_{0,1,2}(4,4,3)	s{4,6}^{1}/_{2} s(4,4,3)	hr{4,6}^{1}/_{2} hr(4,3,4)	h{4,6}^{1}/_{2} h(4,3,4)	q{4,6} h_{1}(4,3,4)
Uniform duals
V(3.4)^{4}	V3.8.4.8	V(4.4)^{3}	V3.8.4.8	V(3.4)^{4}	V4.6.4.6	V6.8.8	V3.3.3.4.3.4	V(4.4.3)^{2}	V6^{6}	V4.3.4.6.6

Similar H2 tilings in *3232 symmetry
Coxeter diagrams				
Vertex figure	6^{6}	(3.4.3.4)^{2}	3.4.6.6.4	6.4.6.4
Image				
Dual				

== See also ==
- Square tiling
- Tilings of regular polygons
- List of uniform planar tilings
- List of regular polytopes
