= Order-4 hexagonal tiling =

Regular tiling of the hyperbolic plane

Order-4 hexagonal tiling
Poincaré disk model of the hyperbolic plane
| Type | Hyperbolic regular tiling |
| Vertex configuration | 6^{4} |
| Schläfli symbol | {6,4} |
| Wythoff symbol | 4 | 6 2 |
| Coxeter diagram | |
| Symmetry group | [6,4], (*642) |
| Dual | Order-6 square tiling |
| Properties | Vertex-transitive, edge-transitive, face-transitive |

In geometry, the order-4 hexagonal tiling is a regular tiling of the hyperbolic plane. It has Schläfli symbol of {6,4}.

== Symmetry ==
This tiling represents a hyperbolic kaleidoscope of 6 mirrors defining a regular hexagon fundamental domain. This symmetry by orbifold notation is called *222222 with six order-2 mirror intersections. In Coxeter notation can be represented as [6^{*},4], removing two of three mirrors (passing through the hexagon center). Adding a bisecting mirror through two vertices of a hexagonal fundamental domain defines a trapezohedral *4422 symmetry. Adding three bisecting mirrors through the vertices defines *443 symmetry. Adding three bisecting mirrors through the edge defines *3222 symmetry. Adding all six bisectors leads to full *642 symmetry.

| *222222 | *443 | *3222 | *642 |

== Uniform colorings ==
There are seven distinct uniform colorings for the order-4 hexagonal tiling. They are similar to seven of the uniform colorings of the square tiling, but exclude two cases with order-2 gyrational symmetry. Four of them have reflective constructions and Coxeter diagrams while three of them are undercolorings.

Uniform constructions of 6.6.6.6
| | 1 color | 2 colors | 3 and 2 colors | | 4, 3 and 2 colors | | |
|---|---|---|---|---|---|---|---|
| Uniform Coloring | (1111) | (1212) | (1213) | (1113) | (1234) | (1123) | (1122) |
| Symmetry | [6,4] (*642) | [6,6] (*662) = | [(6,6,3)] = [6,6,1^{+}] (*663) = | | [1^{+},6,6,1^{+}] (*3333) = = | | |
| Symbol | {6,4} | r{6,6} = {6,4}^{1}/_{2} | r(6,3,6) = r{6,6}^{1}/_{2} | | r{6,6}^{1}/_{4} | | |
| Coxeter diagram | | = | = | | = = | | |

== Regular maps ==
The regular map {6,4}_{3} or {6,4}_{(4,0)} can be seen as a 4-coloring on the {6,4} tiling. It also has a representation as a petrial octahedron, {3,4}^{π}, an abstract polyhedron with vertices and edges of an octahedron, but instead connected by 4 Petrie polygon faces.

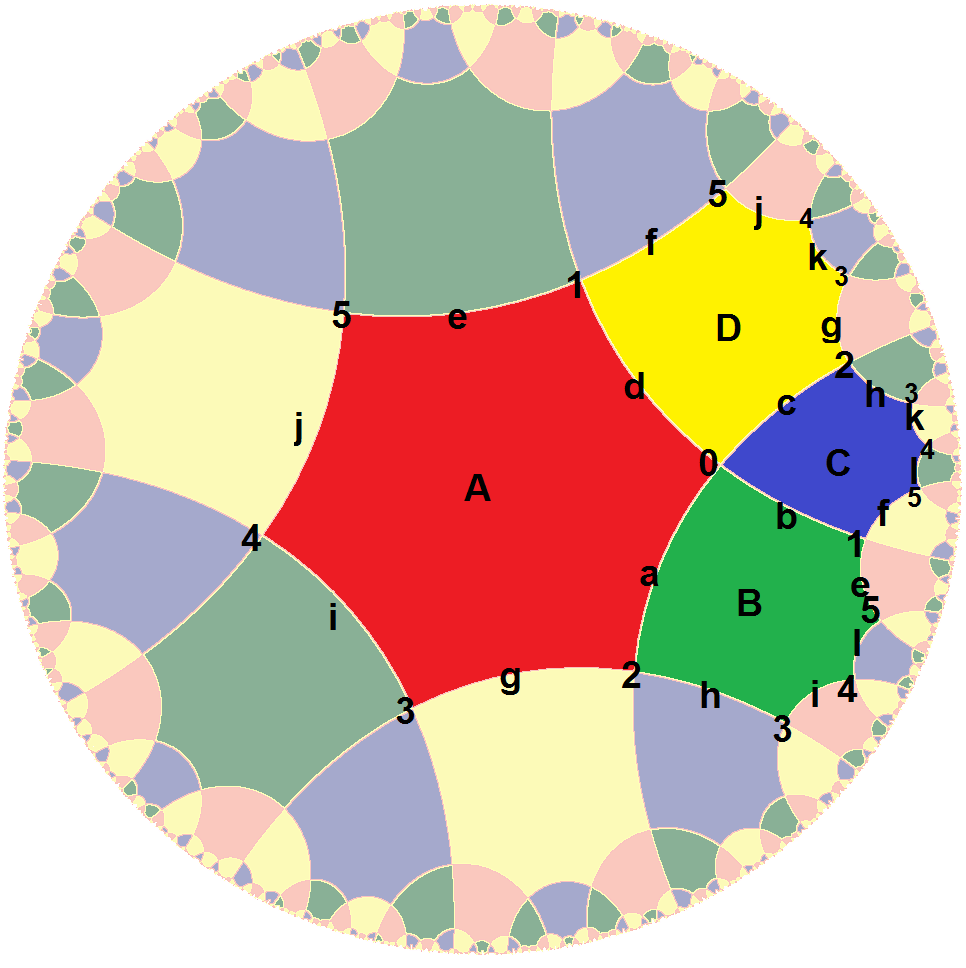
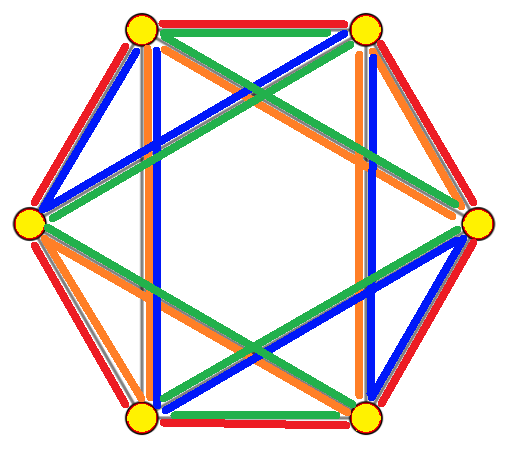

== Related polyhedra and tiling ==
This tiling is topologically related as a part of sequence of regular tilings with hexagonal faces, starting with the hexagonal tiling, with Schläfli symbol {6,n}, and Coxeter diagram, progressing to infinity.

*n62 symmetry mutation of regular tilings: {6,n}
| Spherical | Euclidean | Hyperbolic tilings | | | | | | |
|---|---|---|---|---|---|---|---|---|
| {6,2} | {6,3} | {6,4} | {6,5} | {6,6} | {6,7} | {6,8} | ... | {6,∞} |

This tiling is also topologically related as a part of sequence of regular polyhedra and tilings with four faces per vertex, starting with the octahedron, with Schläfli symbol {n,4}, and Coxeter diagram, with n progressing to infinity.

*n42 symmetry mutation of regular tilings: {n,4}
| Spherical | | Euclidean | Hyperbolic tilings | | | | |
|---|---|---|---|---|---|---|---|
| 2^{4} | 3^{4} | 4^{4} | 5^{4} | 6^{4} | 7^{4} | 8^{4} | ...∞^{4} |

Symmetry mutation of quasiregular tilings: (6.n)^{2}
| Symmetry *6n2 [n,6] | Euclidean | Compact hyperbolic | | | | | Paracompact | Noncompact |
| Symmetry *6n2 [n,6] | *632 [3,6] | *642 [4,6] | *652 [5,6] | *662 [6,6] | *762 [7,6] | *862 [8,6]... | *∞62 [∞,6] | [iπ/λ,6] |
|---|---|---|---|---|---|---|---|---|
| Quasiregular figures configuration | 6.3.6.3 | 6.4.6.4 | 6.5.6.5 | 6.6.6.6 | 6.7.6.7 | 6.8.6.8 | 6.∞.6.∞ | 6.∞.6.∞ |
Dual figures
| Rhombic figures configuration | V6.3.6.3 | V6.4.6.4 | V6.5.6.5 | V6.6.6.6 | V6.7.6.7 | V6.8.6.8 | V6.∞.6.∞ | |

Uniform tetrahexagonal tilings
Symmetry: [6,4], (*642) (with [6,6] (*662), [(4,3,3)] (*443) , [∞,3,∞] (*3222) index 2 subsymmetries) (And [(∞,3,∞,3)] (*3232) index 4 subsymmetry)
| = = = | = | = = = | = | = = = | = | |
| {6,4} | t{6,4} | r{6,4} | t{4,6} | {4,6} | rr{6,4} | tr{6,4} |
Uniform duals
| V6^{4} | V4.12.12 | V(4.6)^{2} | V6.8.8 | V4^{6} | V4.4.4.6 | V4.8.12 |
Alternations
| [1^{+},6,4] (*443) | [6^{+},4] (6*2) | [6,1^{+},4] (*3222) | [6,4^{+}] (4*3) | [6,4,1^{+}] (*662) | [(6,4,2^{+})] (2*32) | [6,4]^{+} (642) |
| = | = | = | = | = | = | |
| h{6,4} | s{6,4} | hr{6,4} | s{4,6} | h{4,6} | hrr{6,4} | sr{6,4} |

Uniform hexahexagonal tilings
Symmetry: [6,6], (*662)
| = = | = = | = = | = = | = = | = = | = = |
| {6,6} = h{4,6} | t{6,6} = h_{2}{4,6} | r{6,6} {6,4} | t{6,6} = h_{2}{4,6} | {6,6} = h{4,6} | rr{6,6} r{6,4} | tr{6,6} t{6,4} |
Uniform duals
| V6^{6} | V6.12.12 | V6.6.6.6 | V6.12.12 | V6^{6} | V4.6.4.6 | V4.12.12 |
Alternations
| [1^{+},6,6] (*663) | [6^{+},6] (6*3) | [6,1^{+},6] (*3232) | [6,6^{+}] (6*3) | [6,6,1^{+}] (*663) | [(6,6,2^{+})] (2*33) | [6,6]^{+} (662) |
| = | | = | | = | | |
| h{6,6} | s{6,6} | hr{6,6} | s{6,6} | h{6,6} | hrr{6,6} | sr{6,6} |

Similar H2 tilings in *3232 symmetry
| Coxeter diagrams | | | | |
| Vertex figure | 6^{6} | (3.4.3.4)^{2} | 3.4.6.6.4 | 6.4.6.4 |
| Image | | | | |
| Dual | | | | |

Uniform tilings in symmetry *3222
| 6^{4} | 6.6.4.4 | (3.4.4)^{2} | 4.3.4.3.3.3 |
| 6.6.4.4 | 6.4.4.4 | 3.4.4.4.4 | |
| (3.4.4)^{2} | 3.4.4.4.4 | 4^{6} | |

== See also ==
- Square tiling
- Tilings of regular polygons
- List of uniform planar tilings
- List of regular polytopes
