= Order-6 hexagonal tiling =

Regular tiling of the hyperbolic plane

Order-6 hexagonal tiling
Poincaré disk model of the hyperbolic plane
Type	Hyperbolic regular tiling
Vertex configuration	6^{6}
Schläfli symbol	{6,6}
Wythoff symbol	6 | 6 2
Coxeter diagram	
Symmetry group	[6,6], (*662)
Dual	self dual
Properties	Vertex-transitive, edge-transitive, face-transitive

In geometry, the order-6 hexagonal tiling is a regular tiling of the hyperbolic plane. It has Schläfli symbol of {6,6} and is self-dual.

== Symmetry ==
This tiling represents a hyperbolic kaleidoscope of 6 mirrors defining a regular hexagon fundamental domain. This symmetry by orbifold notation is called *333333 with 6 order-3 mirror intersections. In Coxeter notation can be represented as [6^{*},6], removing two of three mirrors (passing through the hexagon center) in the [6,6] symmetry.

The even/odd fundamental domains of this kaleidoscope can be seen in the alternating colorings of the tiling:

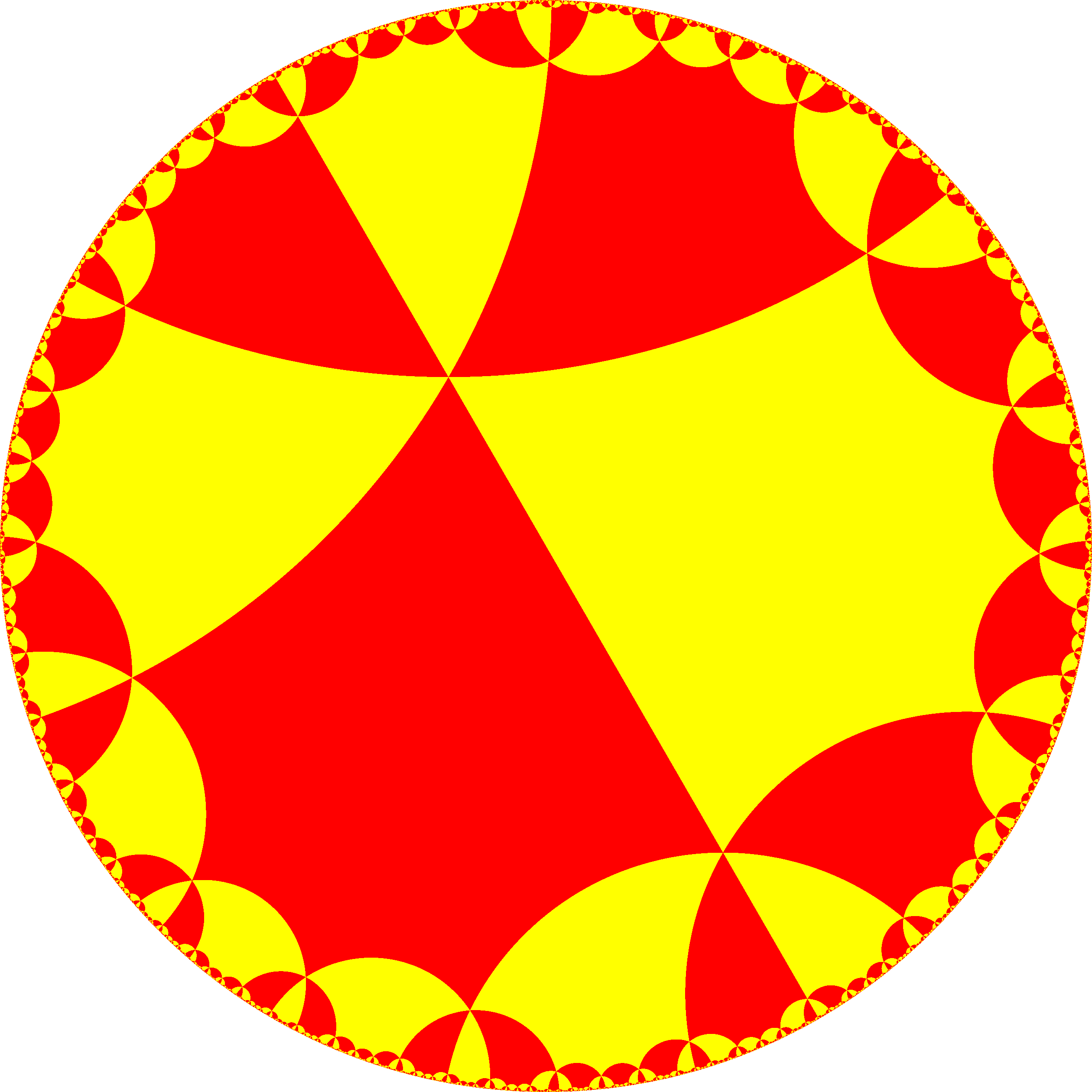

== Related polyhedra and tiling ==
This tiling is topologically related as a part of sequence of regular tilings with order-6 vertices with Schläfli symbol {n,6}, and Coxeter diagram, progressing to infinity.

Regular tilings {n,6}
Spherical	Euclidean	Hyperbolic tilings						
{2,6}	{3,6}	{4,6}	{5,6}	{6,6}	{7,6}	{8,6}	...	{∞,6}

This tiling is topologically related as a part of sequence of regular tilings with hexagonal faces, starting with the hexagonal tiling, with Schläfli symbol {6,n}, and Coxeter diagram, progressing to infinity.

*n62 symmetry mutation of regular tilings: {6,n}
Spherical	Euclidean	Hyperbolic tilings						
{6,2}	{6,3}	{6,4}	{6,5}	{6,6}	{6,7}	{6,8}	...	{6,∞}

Uniform hexahexagonal tilings
Symmetry: [6,6], (*662)
= =	= =	= =	= =	= =	= =	= =
{6,6} = h{4,6}	t{6,6} = h_{2}{4,6}	r{6,6} {6,4}	t{6,6} = h_{2}{4,6}	{6,6} = h{4,6}	rr{6,6} r{6,4}	tr{6,6} t{6,4}
Uniform duals
V6^{6}	V6.12.12	V6.6.6.6	V6.12.12	V6^{6}	V4.6.4.6	V4.12.12
Alternations
[1^{+},6,6] (*663)	[6^{+},6] (6*3)	[6,1^{+},6] (*3232)	[6,6^{+}] (6*3)	[6,6,1^{+}] (*663)	[(6,6,2^{+})] (2*33)	[6,6]^{+} (662)
=		=		=		
h{6,6}	s{6,6}	hr{6,6}	s{6,6}	h{6,6}	hrr{6,6}	sr{6,6}

Similar H2 tilings in *3232 symmetry
Coxeter diagrams				
Vertex figure	6^{6}	(3.4.3.4)^{2}	3.4.6.6.4	6.4.6.4
Image				
Dual				

== See also ==
- Square tiling
- Tilings of regular polygons
- List of uniform planar tilings
- List of regular polytopes
