= Edge tessellation =

Tiling by polygons whose reflections across edges are other tiles

In geometry, an edge tessellation is a partition of the plane into non-overlapping polygons (a tessellation) with the property that the reflection of any of these polygons across any of its edges is another polygon in the tessellation. All of the resulting polygons must be convex, and congruent to each other. There are eight possible edge tessellations in Euclidean geometry, but others exist in non-Euclidean geometry.

The eight Euclidean edge tessellations are:

Tiling with rectangles	Triangular tiling	Tetrakis square tiling	Kisrhombille tiling
Hexagonal tiling	Rhombille tiling	Deltoidal trihexagonal tiling	Triakis triangular tiling

In the first four of these, the tiles have no obtuse angles, and the degrees of the vertices are all even. Because the degrees are even, the sides of the tiles form lines through the tiling, so each of these four tessellations can alternatively be viewed as an arrangement of lines. In the second four, each tile has at least one obtuse angle at which the degree is three, and the sides of tiles that meet at that angle do not extend to lines in the same way.

These tessellations were considered by 19th-century inventor David Brewster in the design of kaleidoscopes. A kaleidoscope whose mirrors are arranged in the shape of one of these tiles will produce the appearance of an edge tessellation. However, in the tessellations generated by kaleidoscopes, it does not work to have vertices of odd degree, because when the image within a single tile is asymmetric there would be no way to reflect that image consistently to all the copies of the tile around an odd-degree vertex. Therefore, Brewster considered only the edge tessellations with no obtuse angles, omitting the four that have obtuse angles and degree-three vertices.

== See also ==
- Reflection group
