= Truncated hexagonal tiling =

Semiregular tiling of a plane

Truncated hexagonal tiling
Truncated hexagonal tiling
Type	Semiregular tiling
Vertex configuration	3.12.12
Schläfli symbol	t{6,3}
Wythoff symbol	2 3 | 6
Coxeter diagram	
Symmetry	p6m, [6,3], (*632)
Rotation symmetry	p6, [6,3]^{+}, (632)
Bowers acronym	Toxat
Dual	Triakis triangular tiling
Properties	Vertex-transitive

In geometry, the truncated hexagonal tiling is a semiregular tiling of the Euclidean plane. There are 2 dodecagons (12-sides) and one triangle on each vertex.

As the name implies this tiling is constructed by a truncation operation applied to a hexagonal tiling, leaving dodecagons in place of the original hexagons, and new triangles at the original vertex locations. It is given an extended Schläfli symbol of t{6,3}.

Conway calls it a truncated hextille, constructed as a truncation operation applied to a hexagonal tiling (hextille).

There are 3 regular and 8 semiregular tilings in the plane.

== Uniform colorings ==
There is only one uniform coloring of a truncated hexagonal tiling. (Naming the colors by indices around a vertex: 122.)

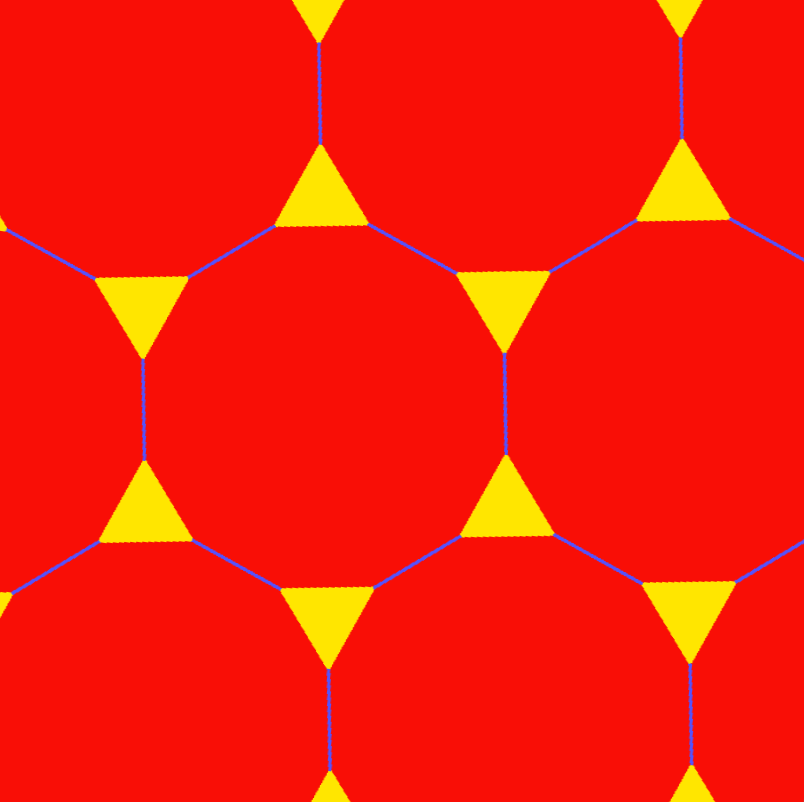

== Topologically identical tilings ==
The dodecagonal faces can be distorted into different geometries, such as:

== Related polyhedra and tilings ==
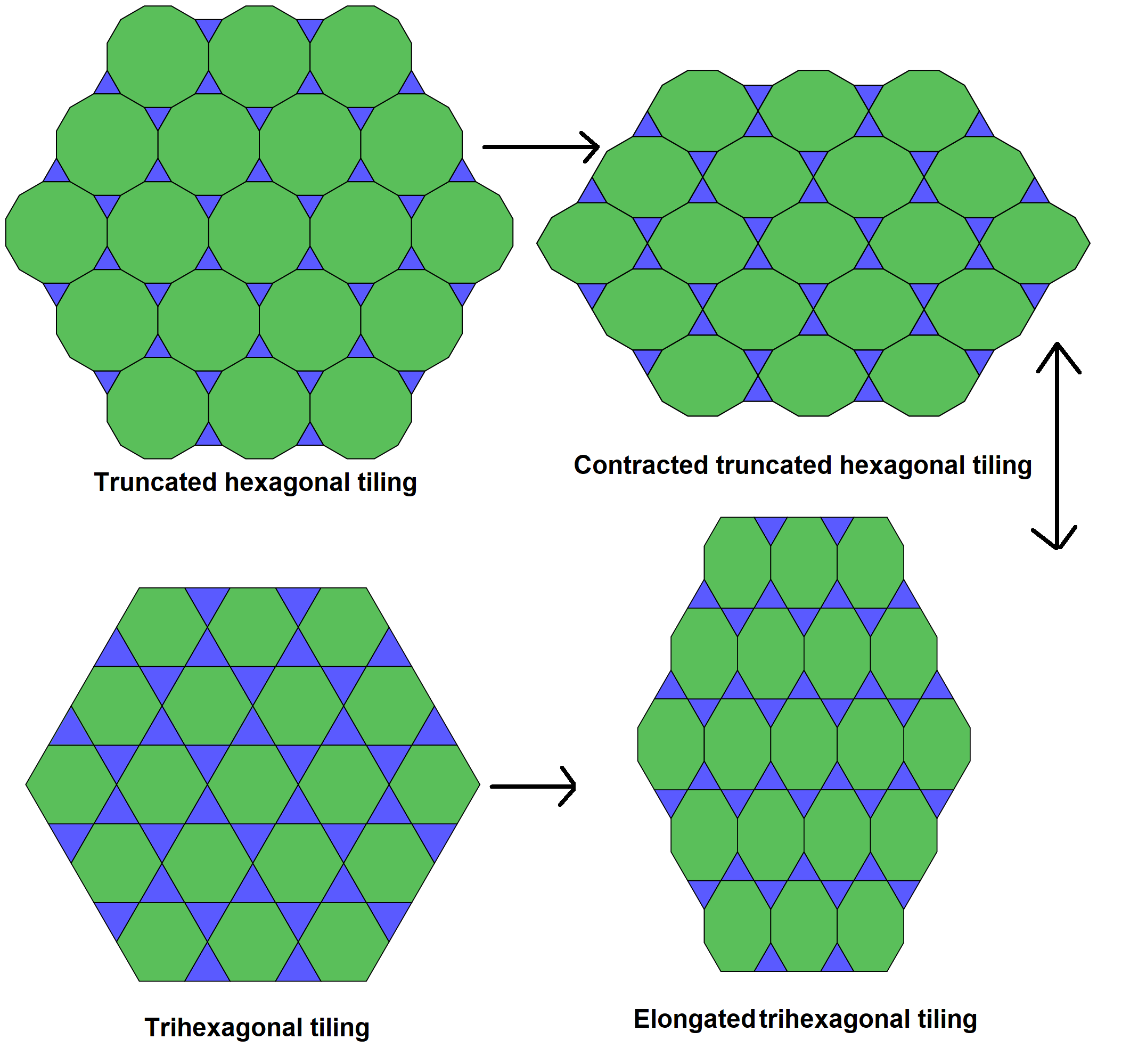
A truncated hexagonal tiling can be contracted in one dimension, reducing dodecagons into decagons. Contracting in second direction reduces decagons into octagons. Contracting a third time make the trihexagonal tiling.

=== Wythoff constructions from hexagonal and triangular tilings ===
Like the uniform polyhedra there are eight uniform tilings that can be based from the regular hexagonal tiling (or the dual triangular tiling).

Drawing the tiles colored as red on the original faces, yellow at the original vertices, and blue along the original edges, there are 8 forms, 7 which are topologically distinct. (The truncated triangular tiling is topologically identical to the hexagonal tiling.)

Uniform hexagonal/triangular tilings
Fundamental domains	Symmetry: [6,3], (*632)							[6,3]^{+}, (632)
Fundamental domains	{6,3}	t{6,3}	r{6,3}	t{3,6}	{3,6}	rr{6,3}	tr{6,3}	sr{6,3}
Config.	6^{3}	3.12.12	(6.3)^{2}	6.6.6	3^{6}	3.4.6.4	4.6.12	3.3.3.3.6

=== Symmetry mutations ===
This tiling is topologically related as a part of sequence of uniform truncated polyhedra with vertex configurations (3.2n.2n), and [n,3] Coxeter group symmetry.

*n32 symmetry mutation of truncated tilings: t{n,3}
Symmetry *n32 [n,3]	Spherical				Euclid.	Compact hyperb.		Paraco.	Noncompact hyperbolic		
Symmetry *n32 [n,3]	*232 [2,3]	*332 [3,3]	*432 [4,3]	*532 [5,3]	*632 [6,3]	*732 [7,3]	*832 [8,3]...	*∞32 [∞,3]	[12i,3]	[9i,3]	[6i,3]
Truncated figures											
Symbol	t{2,3}	t{3,3}	t{4,3}	t{5,3}	t{6,3}	t{7,3}	t{8,3}	t{∞,3}	t{12i,3}	t{9i,3}	t{6i,3}
Triakis figures											
Config.	V3.4.4	V3.6.6	V3.8.8	V3.10.10	V3.12.12	V3.14.14	V3.16.16	V3.∞.∞			

=== Related 2-uniform tilings ===
Two 2-uniform tilings are related by dissected the dodecagons into a central hexagonal and 6 surrounding triangles and squares.

1-uniform	Dissection	2-uniform dissections	
(3.12^{2})		(3.4.6.4) & (3^{3}.4^{2})	(3.4.6.4) & (3^{2}.4.3.4)
Dual Tilings
O		to DB	to DC

=== Circle packing ===
The truncated hexagonal tiling can be used as a circle packing, placing equal diameter circles at the center of every point. Every circle is in contact with 3 other circles in the packing (kissing number). This is the lowest density packing that can be created from a uniform tiling.

=== Triakis triangular tiling ===
Triakis triangular tiling
- Type: Dual semiregular tiling
- Wallpaper group: p6m, [6,3], (*632)
- Rotation group: p6, [6,3]^{+}, (632)
- Dual: Truncated hexagonal tiling
- Face configuration: V3.12.12
- Properties: face-transitive

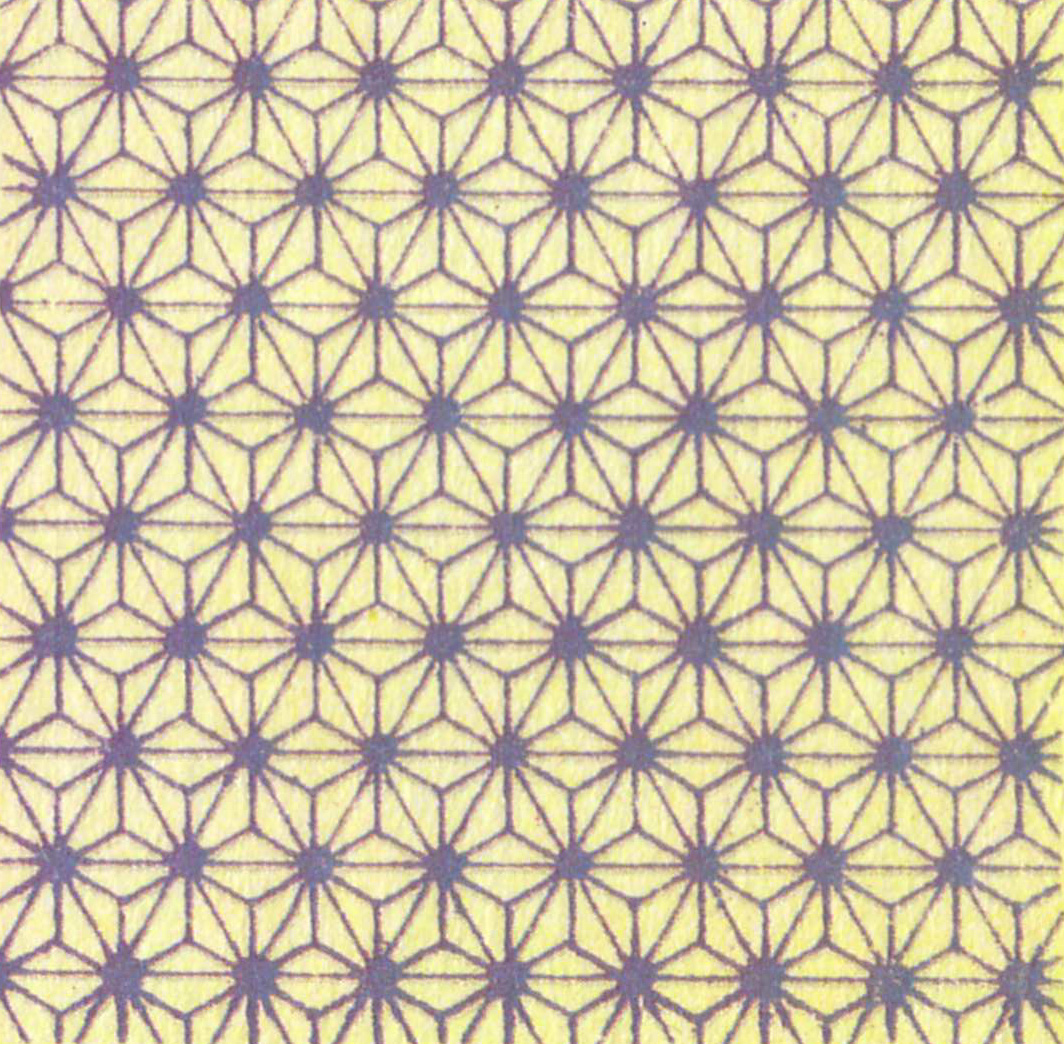
On painted porcelain, China

The triakis triangular tiling is a tiling of the Euclidean plane. It is an equilateral triangular tiling with each triangle divided into three obtuse triangles (angles 30-30-120) from the center point. It is labeled by face configuration V3.12.12 because each isosceles triangle face has two types of vertices: one with 3 triangles, and two with 12 triangles.

Conway calls it a kisdeltille, constructed as a kis operation applied to a triangular tiling (deltille).

In Japan the pattern is called asanoha for hemp leaf, although the name also applies to other triakis shapes like the triakis icosahedron and triakis octahedron.

It is the dual tessellation of the truncated hexagonal tiling which has one triangle and two dodecagons at each vertex.

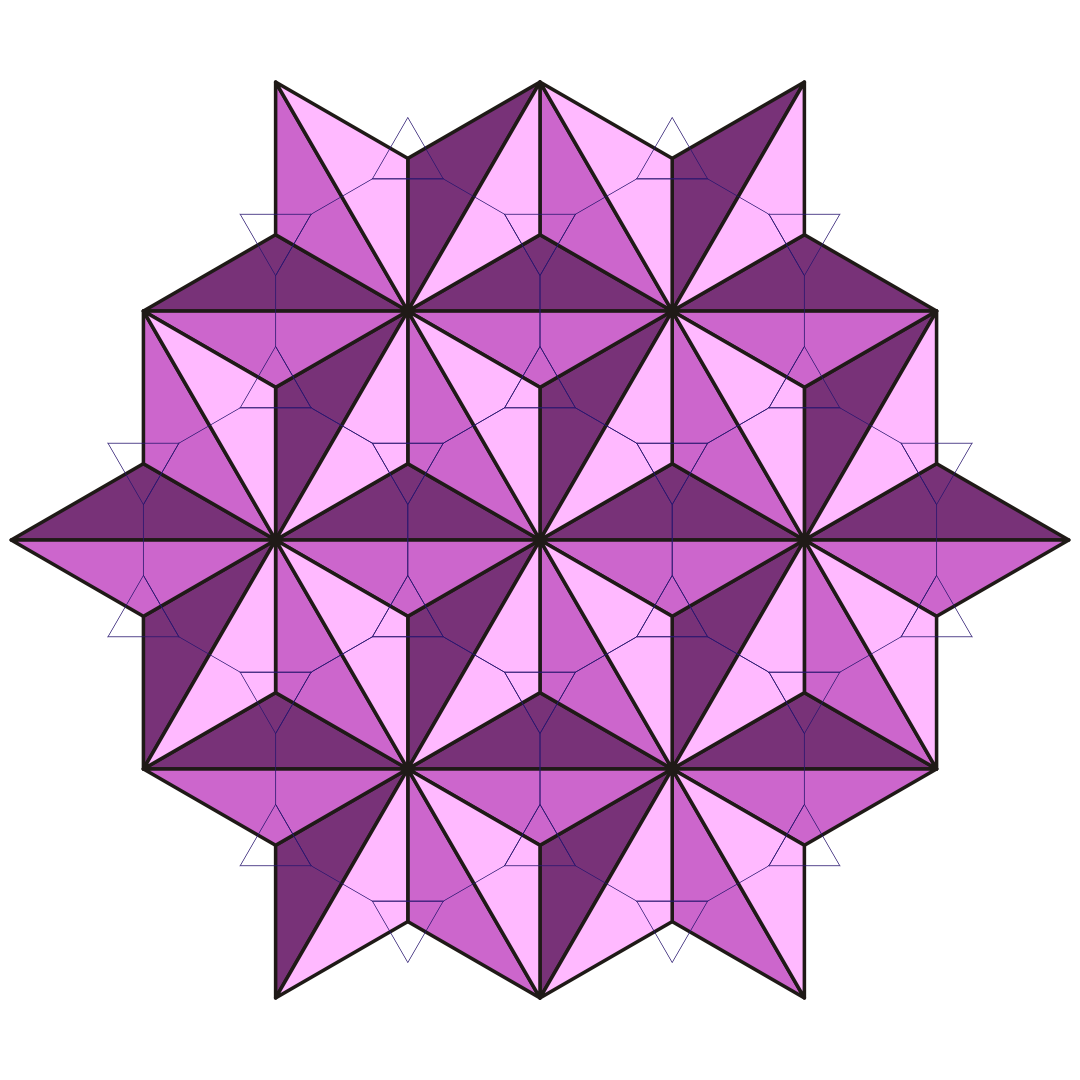

It is one of eight edge tessellations, tessellations generated by reflections across each edge of a prototile.

==== Related duals to uniform tilings ====
It is one of 7 dual uniform tilings in hexagonal symmetry, including the regular duals.

Dual uniform hexagonal/triangular tilings
Symmetry: [6,3], (*632)						[6,3]^{+}, (632)
V6^{3}	V3.12^{2}	V(3.6)^{2}	V3^{6}	V3.4.6.4	V.4.6.12	V3^{4}.6

== See also ==
- Tilings of regular polygons
- List of uniform tilings
