= Truncated trihexagonal tiling =

Uniform tiling of the Euclidean plane

Truncated trihexagonal tiling
Truncated trihexagonal tiling
| Type | Semiregular tiling |
| Vertex configuration | 4.6.12 |
| Schläfli symbol | tr{6,3} or $t\begin{Bmatrix} 6 \\ 3 \end{Bmatrix}$ |
| Wythoff symbol | 2 6 3 | |
| Coxeter diagram | |
| Symmetry | p6m, [6,3], (*632) |
| Rotation symmetry | p6, [6,3]^{+}, (632) |
| Bowers acronym | Othat |
| Dual | Kisrhombille tiling |
| Properties | Vertex-transitive |

In geometry, the truncated trihexagonal tiling is one of eight semiregular tilings of the Euclidean plane. There are one square, one hexagon, and one dodecagon on each vertex. It has Schläfli symbol of tr{3,6}.

An equilateral variation with rhombi instead of squares, and isotoxal hexagons instead of regular

== Names ==
The name truncated trihexagonal tiling is analogous to truncated cuboctahedron and truncated icosidodecahedron, and misleading in the same way. An actual truncation of the trihexagonal tiling has rectangles instead of squares, and its hexagonal and dodecagonal faces can not both be regular.

Alternate interchangeable names are:

- Great rhombitrihexagonal tiling
- Rhombitruncated trihexagonal tiling
- Omnitruncated hexagonal tiling, omnitruncated triangular tiling
- Conway calls it a truncated hexadeltille.
Trihexagonal tiling and its truncation

== Uniform colorings ==
There is only one uniform coloring of a truncated trihexagonal tiling, with faces colored by polygon sides. A 2-uniform coloring has two colors of hexagons. 3-uniform colorings can have 3 colors of dodecagons or 3 colors of squares.

| | 1-uniform | 2-uniform | 3-uniform |
|---|---|---|---|
| Coloring | | | |
| Symmetry | p6m, [6,3], (*632) | p3m1, [3^{[3]}], (*333) | |

== Related 2-uniform tilings ==
The truncated trihexagonal tiling has three related 2-uniform tilings, one being a 2-uniform coloring of the semiregular rhombitrihexagonal tiling. The first dissects the hexagons into 6 triangles. The other two dissect the dodecagons into a central hexagon and surrounding triangles and square, in two different orientations.

| Semiregular | Dissections | Semiregular | 2-uniform | 3-uniform |
| Dual | Insets | | | |

== Circle packing ==
The Truncated trihexagonal tiling can be used as a circle packing, placing equal diameter circles at the center of every point. Every circle is in contact with 3 other circles in the packing (kissing number).

== Kisrhombille tiling ==
Kisrhombille tiling
- Type: Dual semiregular tiling
- Wallpaper group: p6m, [6,3], (*632)
- Rotation group: p6, [6,3]^{+}, (632)
- Dual: truncated trihexagonal tiling
- Face configuration: V4.6.12
- Properties: face-transitive

The kisrhombille tiling or 3-6 kisrhombille tiling is a tiling of the Euclidean plane. It is constructed by congruent 30-60-90 triangles with 4, 6, and 12 triangles meeting at each vertex.

Subdividing the faces of these tilings creates the kisrhombille tiling. (Compare the disdyakis hexa-, dodeca- and triacontahedron, three Catalan solids similar to this tiling.)

3-6 deltoidal

rhombille

hexagonal

hexagonal
(as exploded triangular)

triangular

triangular
(as hexakis hexagonal)

triakis triangular
The kisrhombille tiling under its dual (left) and under the floret pentagonal tiling (right), from which it can be created as a partial truncation.

=== Construction from rhombille tiling ===
Conway calls it a kisrhombille for his kis vertex bisector operation applied to the rhombille tiling. More specifically it can be called a 3-6 kisrhombille, to distinguish it from other similar hyperbolic tilings, like 3-7 kisrhombille.

It can be seen as an equilateral hexagonal tiling with each hexagon divided into 12 triangles from the center point. (Alternately it can be seen as a bisected triangular tiling divided into 6 triangles, or as an infinite arrangement of lines in six parallel families.)

It is labeled V4.6.12 because each right triangle face has three types of vertices: one with 4 triangles, one with 6 triangles, and one with 12 triangles.

=== Symmetry ===
The kisrhombille tiling triangles represent the fundamental domains of p6m, [6,3] (*632 orbifold notation) wallpaper group symmetry. There are a number of small index subgroups constructed from [6,3] by mirror removal and alternation. [1^{+},6,3] creates *333 symmetry, shown as red mirror lines. [6,3^{+}] creates 3*3 symmetry. [6,3]^{+} is the rotational subgroup. The commutator subgroup is [1^{+},6,3^{+}], which is 333 symmetry. A larger index 6 subgroup constructed as [6,3*], also becomes (*333), shown in blue mirror lines, and which has its own 333 rotational symmetry, index 12.

Small index subgroups [6,3] (*632)
| Index | 1 | 2 | | 3 | 6 | |
|---|---|---|---|---|---|---|
| Diagram | | | | | | |
| Intl (orb.) Coxeter | p6m (*632) [6,3] = = | p3m1 (*333) [1^{+},6,3] = = | p31m (3*3) [6,3^{+}] = | cmm (2*22) | pmm (*2222) | p3m1 (*333) [6,3*] = = |
Direct subgroups
| Index | 2 | 4 | | 6 | 12 | |
| Diagram | | | | | | |
| Intl (orb.) Coxeter | p6 (632) [6,3]^{+} = = | p3 (333) [1^{+},6,3^{+}] = = | | p2 (2222) | p2 (2222) | p3 (333) [1^{+},6,3*] = = |

== Related polyhedra and tilings ==
There are eight uniform tilings that can be based from the regular hexagonal tiling (or the dual triangular tiling). Drawing the tiles colored as red on the original faces, yellow at the original vertices, and blue along the original edges, there are 8 forms, 7 which are topologically distinct. (The truncated triangular tiling is topologically identical to the hexagonal tiling.)

Uniform hexagonal/triangular tilings
| Symmetry: [6,3], (*632) | | | | | | | [6,3]^{+} (632) | [6,3^{+}] (3*3) |
|---|---|---|---|---|---|---|---|---|
| {6,3} | t{6,3} | r{6,3} | t{3,6} | {3,6} | rr{6,3} | tr{6,3} | sr{6,3} | s{3,6} |
| 6^{3} | 3.12^{2} | (3.6)^{2} | 6.6.6 | 3^{6} | 3.4.6.4 | 4.6.12 | 3.3.3.3.6 | 3.3.3.3.3.3 |
Uniform duals
| V6^{3} | V3.12^{2} | V(3.6)^{2} | V6^{3} | V3^{6} | V3.4.6.4 | V.4.6.12 | V3^{4}.6 | V3^{6} |

=== Symmetry mutations ===
This tiling can be considered a member of a sequence of uniform patterns with vertex figure (4.6.2p) and Coxeter-Dynkin diagram. For p < 6, the members of the sequence are omnitruncated polyhedra (zonohedra), shown below as spherical tilings. For p > 6, they are tilings of the hyperbolic plane, starting with the truncated triheptagonal tiling.

*n32 symmetry mutation of omnitruncated tilings: 4.6.2n
| Sym. *n32 [n,3] | Spherical | | | | Euclid. | Compact hyperb. | | Paraco. | Noncompact hyperbolic | | | |
| Sym. *n32 [n,3] | *232 [2,3] | *332 [3,3] | *432 [4,3] | *532 [5,3] | *632 [6,3] | *732 [7,3] | *832 [8,3] | *∞32 [∞,3] | [12i,3] | [9i,3] | [6i,3] | [3i,3] |
|---|---|---|---|---|---|---|---|---|---|---|---|---|
| Figures | | | | | | | | | | | | |
| Config. | 4.6.4 | 4.6.6 | 4.6.8 | 4.6.10 | 4.6.12 | 4.6.14 | 4.6.16 | 4.6.∞ | 4.6.24i | 4.6.18i | 4.6.12i | 4.6.6i |
| Duals | | | | | | | | | | | | |
| Config. | V4.6.4 | V4.6.6 | V4.6.8 | V4.6.10 | V4.6.12 | V4.6.14 | V4.6.16 | V4.6.∞ | V4.6.24i | V4.6.18i | V4.6.12i | V4.6.6i |

== See also ==
- Tilings of regular polygons
- List of uniform tilings
