= Rhombitrihexagonal tiling =

Semiregular tiling of the Euclidean plane

Rhombitrihexagonal tiling
Rhombitrihexagonal tiling
Type	Semiregular tiling
Vertex configuration	3.4.6.4
Schläfli symbol	rr{6,3} or $r\begin{Bmatrix} 6 \\ 3 \end{Bmatrix}$
Wythoff symbol	3 | 6 2
Coxeter diagram	
Symmetry	p6m, [6,3], (*632)
Rotation symmetry	p6, [6,3]^{+}, (632)
Bowers acronym	Rothat
Dual	Deltoidal trihexagonal tiling
Properties	Vertex-transitive

In geometry, the rhombitrihexagonal tiling is a semiregular tiling of the Euclidean plane. There are one triangle, two squares, and one hexagon on each vertex. It has Schläfli symbol of rr{3,6}.

John Conway calls it a rhombihexadeltille. It can be considered a cantellated by Norman Johnson's terminology or an expanded hexagonal tiling by Alicia Boole Stott's operational language.

There are three regular and eight semiregular tilings in the plane.

== Uniform colorings ==
There is only one uniform coloring in a rhombitrihexagonal tiling. (Naming the colors by indices around a vertex (3.4.6.4): 1232.)

With edge-colorings there is a half symmetry form (3*3) orbifold notation. The hexagons can be considered as truncated triangles, t{3} with two types of edges. It has Coxeter diagram, Schläfli symbol s_{2}{3,6}. The bicolored square can be distorted into isosceles trapezoids. In the limit, where the rectangles degenerate into edges, a triangular tiling results, constructed as a snub triangular tiling,.

Symmetry	[6,3], (*632)	[6,3^{+}], (3*3)		
Name	Rhombitrihexagonal	Cantic snub triangular		Snub triangular
Image	Uniform face coloring	Uniform edge coloring	Nonuniform geometry	Limit
Schläfli symbol	rr{3,6}	s_{2}{3,6}		s{3,6}
Coxeter diagram				

== Examples ==
From The Grammar of Ornament (1856)	The game Kensington	Floor tiling, Archeological Museum of Seville, Sevilla, Spain	The Temple of Diana in Nîmes, France	Roman floor mosaic in Castel di Guido

== Related tilings ==
The tiling can be replaced by circular edges, centered on the hexagons as an overlapping circles grid. In quilting it is called Jacks chain.

There is one related 2-uniform tiling, having hexagons dissected into six triangles. The rhombitrihexagonal tiling is also related to the truncated trihexagonal tiling by replacing some of the hexagons and surrounding squares and triangles with dodecagons:

1-uniform	Dissection	2-uniform dissections	
3.4.6.4		3.3.4.3.4 & 3^{6}	to CH
Dual Tilings
3.4.6.4		4.6.12	to 3

=== Circle packing ===
The rhombitrihexagonal tiling can be used as a circle packing, placing equal diameter circles at the center of every point. Every circle is in contact with four other circles in the packing (kissing number). The translational lattice domain (red rhombus) contains six distinct circles.

=== Wythoff construction ===
There are eight uniform tilings that can be based from the regular hexagonal tiling (or the dual triangular tiling).

Drawing the tiles colored as red on the original faces, yellow at the original vertices, and blue along the original edges, there are eight forms, seven topologically distinct. (The truncated triangular tiling is topologically identical to the hexagonal tiling.)

Uniform hexagonal/triangular tilings
Symmetry: [6,3], (*632)							[6,3]^{+} (632)	[6,3^{+}] (3*3)
{6,3}	t{6,3}	r{6,3}	t{3,6}	{3,6}	rr{6,3}	tr{6,3}	sr{6,3}	s{3,6}
6^{3}	3.12^{2}	(3.6)^{2}	6.6.6	3^{6}	3.4.6.4	4.6.12	3.3.3.3.6	3.3.3.3.3.3
Uniform duals
V6^{3}	V3.12^{2}	V(3.6)^{2}	V6^{3}	V3^{6}	V3.4.6.4	V.4.6.12	V3^{4}.6	V3^{6}

=== Symmetry mutations ===
This tiling is topologically related as a part of sequence of cantellated polyhedra with vertex figure (3.4.n.4), and continues as tilings of the hyperbolic plane. These vertex-transitive figures have (*n32) reflectional symmetry.

*n32 symmetry mutation of expanded tilings: 3.4.n.4
Symmetry *n32 [n,3]	Spherical				Euclid.	Compact hyperb.		Paracomp.
Symmetry *n32 [n,3]	*232 [2,3]	*332 [3,3]	*432 [4,3]	*532 [5,3]	*632 [6,3]	*732 [7,3]	*832 [8,3]...	*∞32 [∞,3]
Figure								
Config.	3.4.2.4	3.4.3.4	3.4.4.4	3.4.5.4	3.4.6.4	3.4.7.4	3.4.8.4	3.4.∞.4

=== Deltoidal trihexagonal tiling ===
Deltoidal trihexagonal tiling
- Type: Dual semiregular tiling
- Wallpaper group: p6m, [6,3], (*632)
- Rotation group: p6, [6,3]^{+}, (632)
- Dual: Rhombitrihexagonal tiling
- Face configuration: V3.4.6.4
- Properties: face-transitive

A 2023 discovered aperiodic monotile, solving the Einstein problem, is composed by a collection of 8 kites from the deltoidal trihexagonal tiling

The deltoidal trihexagonal tiling is a dual of the semiregular tiling known as the rhombitrihexagonal tiling. Conway called it a tetrille. The edges of this tiling can be formed by the intersection overlay of the regular triangular tiling and a hexagonal tiling. Each kite face of this tiling has angles 120°, 90°, 60° and 90°. It is one of only eight tilings of the plane in which every edge lies on a line of symmetry of the tiling.

The deltoidal trihexagonal tiling is a dual of the semiregular tiling rhombitrihexagonal tiling. Its faces are deltoids or kites.

==== Related polyhedra and tilings ====
It is one of seven dual uniform tilings in hexagonal symmetry, including the regular duals.

Dual uniform hexagonal/triangular tilings
Symmetry: [6,3], (*632)						[6,3]^{+}, (632)
V6^{3}	V3.12^{2}	V(3.6)^{2}	V3^{6}	V3.4.6.4	V.4.6.12	V3^{4}.6

This tiling has face transitive variations, that can distort the kites into bilateral trapezoids or more general quadrilaterals. Ignoring the face colors below, the fully symmetry is p6m, and the lower symmetry is p31m with three mirrors meeting at a point, and threefold rotation points.

Isohedral variations
Symmetry	p6m, [6,3], (*632)	p31m, [6,3^{+}], (3*3)	
Form			
Faces	Kite	Half regular hexagon	Quadrilaterals

This tiling is related to the trihexagonal tiling by dividing the triangles and hexagons into central triangles and merging neighboring triangles into kites.

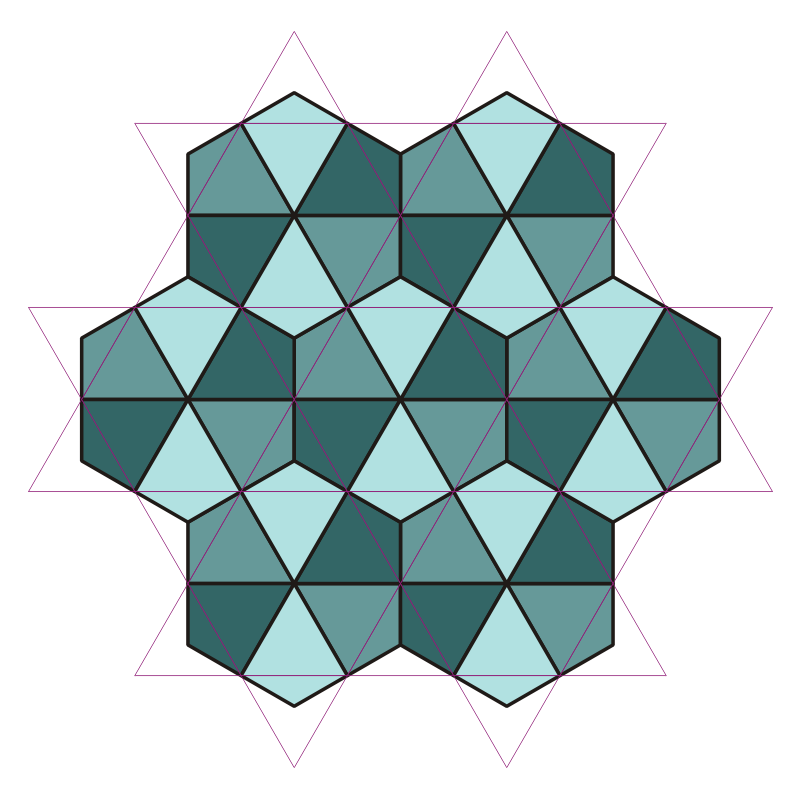

The deltoidal trihexagonal tiling is a part of a set of uniform dual tilings, corresponding to the dual of the rhombitrihexagonal tiling.

=== Symmetry mutations ===
This tiling is topologically related as a part of sequence of tilings with face configurations V3.4.n.4, and continues as tilings of the hyperbolic plane. These face-transitive figures have (*n32) reflectional symmetry.

*n32 symmetry mutation of dual expanded tilings: V3.4.n.4
Symmetry *n32 [n,3]	Spherical				Euclid.	Compact hyperb.		Paraco.
Symmetry *n32 [n,3]	*232 [2,3]	*332 [3,3]	*432 [4,3]	*532 [5,3]	*632 [6,3]	*732 [7,3]	*832 [8,3]...	*∞32 [∞,3]
Figure Config.	V3.4.2.4	V3.4.3.4	V3.4.4.4	V3.4.5.4	V3.4.6.4	V3.4.7.4	V3.4.8.4	V3.4.∞.4

==== Other deltoidal (kite) tiling ====
Other deltoidal tilings are possible.

Point symmetry allows the plane to be filled by growing kites, with the topology as a square tiling, V4.4.4.4, and can be created by crossing string of a dream catcher. Below is an example with dihedral hexagonal symmetry.

Another face transitive tiling with kite faces, also a topological variation of a square tiling and with face configuration V4.4.4.4. It is also vertex transitive, with every vertex containing all orientations of the kite face.

Symmetry	D_{6}, [6], (*66)	pmg, [∞,(2,∞)^{+}], (22*)	p6m, [6,3], (*632)
Tiling			
Configuration	V4.4.4.4		V6.4.3.4

== See also ==
- Tilings of regular polygons
- List of uniform tilings
