= Convex and Concave =

Lithograph by Dutch artist M. C. Escher

- Artist: M. C. Escher
- Year: 1955
- Type: lithograph
- Dimensions: 27.5 cm × 33.5 cm (10.8 in × 13.2 in)

Convex and Concave is a lithograph print by the Dutch artist M. C. Escher, first printed in March 1955.

It depicts an ornate architectural structure with many stairs, pillars and other shapes. The relative aspects of the objects in the image are distorted in such a way that many of the structure's features can be seen as both convex shapes and concave impressions. This is a very good example of Escher's mastery in creating illusions of "impossible architecture". The windows, roads, stairs and other shapes can be perceived as opening out in seemingly impossible ways and positions. Even the image on the flag is of reversible cubes. One can view these features as concave by viewing the image upside-down.

All additional elements and decoration on the left are consistent with a viewpoint from above, while those on the right with a viewpoint from below: hiding half the image makes it very easy to switch between convex and concave.
