= Triangular tiling =

Regular tiling of the plane

Triangular tiling
Triangular tiling
Type	Regular tiling
Vertex configuration	3.3.3.3.3.3 (or 3^{6})
Face configuration	V6.6.6 (or V6^{3})
Schläfli symbol(s)	{3,6} {3^{[3]}}
Wythoff symbol(s)	6 | 3 2; 3 | 3 3 | 3 3 3
Coxeter diagram(s)	=
Symmetry	p6m, [6,3], (*632)
Rotation symmetry	p6, [6,3]^{+}, (632) p3, [3^{[3]}]^{+}, (333)
Dual	Hexagonal tiling
Properties	Vertex-transitive, edge-transitive, face-transitive

In geometry, the triangular tiling or triangular tessellation is one of the three regular tilings of the Euclidean plane, and is the only such tiling where the constituent shapes are not parallelogons. Because the internal angle of the equilateral triangle is 60 degrees, six triangles at a point occupy a full 360 degrees. The triangular tiling has Schläfli symbol of {3,6}.

English mathematician John Conway called it a deltille, named from the triangular shape of the Greek letter delta (Δ). The triangular tiling can also be called a kishextille by a kis operation that adds a center point and triangles to replace the faces of a hextille.

It is one of three regular tilings of the plane. The other two are the square tiling and the hexagonal tiling.

== Uniform colorings ==
A 4-uniform triangular tiling, 4 colored triangles, related to the geodesic polyhedron as {3,6+}_{2,0}.

There are 9 distinct uniform colorings of a triangular tiling. (Naming the colors by indices on the 6 triangles around a vertex: 111111, 111112, 111212, 111213, 111222, 112122, 121212, 121213, 121314) Three of them can be derived from others by repeating colors: 111212 and 111112 from 121213 by combining 1 and 3, while 111213 is reduced from 121314.

There is one class of Archimedean colorings, 111112, (marked with a *) which is not 1-uniform, containing alternate rows of triangles where every third is colored. The example shown is 2-uniform, but there are infinitely many such Archimedean colorings that can be created by arbitrary horizontal shifts of the rows.

111111	121212	111222	112122	111112(*)
p6m (*632)	p3m1 (*333)	cmm (2*22)	p2 (2222)	p2 (2222)

121213	111212	111112	121314	111213
p31m (3*3)			p3 (333)	

== A2 lattice and circle packings ==
The A^{*}_{2} lattice as three triangular tilings: + +

The vertex arrangement of the triangular tiling is called an A_{2} lattice. It is the 2-dimensional case of a simplicial honeycomb.

The A^{*}_{2} lattice (also called A^{3}_{2}) can be constructed by the union of all three A_{2} lattices, and equivalent to the A_{2} lattice.

+ + = dual of =

The vertices of the triangular tiling are the centers of the densest possible circle packing. Every circle is in contact with 6 other circles in the packing (kissing number). The packing density is π/√12 or 90.69%. The voronoi cell of a triangular tiling is a hexagon, and so the voronoi tessellation, the hexagonal tiling, has a direct correspondence to the circle packings.

== Geometric variations ==
Triangular tilings can be made with the equivalent {3,6} topology as the regular tiling (6 triangles around every vertex). With identical faces (face-transitivity) and vertex-transitivity, there are 5 variations. Symmetry given assumes all faces are the same color.

Scalene triangle
p2 symmetry

Scalene triangle
pmg symmetry

Isosceles triangle
cmm symmetry

Right triangle
cmm symmetry

Equilateral triangle
p6m symmetry

== Related polyhedra and tilings ==
The planar tilings are related to polyhedra. Putting fewer triangles on a vertex leaves a gap and allows it to be folded into a pyramid. These can be expanded to Platonic solids: five, four and three triangles on a vertex define an icosahedron, octahedron, and tetrahedron respectively.

This tiling is topologically related as a part of sequence of regular polyhedra with Schläfli symbols {3,n}, continuing into the hyperbolic plane.

*n32 symmetry mutation of regular tilings: {3,n}
Spherical				Euclid.	Compact hyper.		Paraco.	Noncompact hyperbolic			
3.3	3^{3}	3^{4}	3^{5}	3^{6}	3^{7}	3^{8}	3^{∞}	3^{12i}	3^{9i}	3^{6i}	3^{3i}

It is also topologically related as a part of sequence of Catalan solids with face configuration Vn.6.6, and also continuing into the hyperbolic plane.

V3.6.6	V4.6.6	V5.6.6	V6.6.6	V7.6.6

=== Wythoff constructions from hexagonal and triangular tilings ===
Like the uniform polyhedra there are eight uniform tilings that can be based from the regular hexagonal tiling (or the dual triangular tiling).

Drawing the tiles colored as red on the original faces, yellow at the original vertices, and blue along the original edges, there are 8 forms, 7 which are topologically distinct. (The truncated triangular tiling is topologically identical to the hexagonal tiling.)

Uniform hexagonal/triangular tilings
Fundamental domains	Symmetry: [6,3], (*632)							[6,3]^{+}, (632)
Fundamental domains	{6,3}	t{6,3}	r{6,3}	t{3,6}	{3,6}	rr{6,3}	tr{6,3}	sr{6,3}
Config.	6^{3}	3.12.12	(6.3)^{2}	6.6.6	3^{6}	3.4.6.4	4.6.12	3.3.3.3.6

Triangular symmetry tilings
Wythoff	3 | 3 3	3 3 | 3	3 | 3 3	3 3 | 3	3 | 3 3	3 3 | 3	3 3 3 |	| 3 3 3
Coxeter								
Image Vertex figure	(3.3)^{3}	3.6.3.6	(3.3)^{3}	3.6.3.6	(3.3)^{3}	3.6.3.6	6.6.6	3.3.3.3.3.3

== Related regular complex apeirogons ==
There are 4 regular complex apeirogons, sharing the vertices of the triangular tiling. Regular complex apeirogons have vertices and edges, where edges can contain 2 or more vertices. Regular apeirogons p{q}r are constrained by: 1/p + 2/q + 1/r = 1. Edges have p vertices, and vertex figures are r-gonal.

The first is made of 2-edges, and next two are triangular edges, and the last has overlapping hexagonal edges.

2{6}6 or	3{4}6 or	3{6}3 or	6{3}6 or

=== Other triangular tilings ===
There are also three Laves tilings made of single type of triangles:

Kisrhombille; 30°-60°-90° right triangles	Kisquadrille; 45°-45°-90° right triangles	Kisdeltile; 30°-30°-120° isosceles triangles

== See also ==
- Isogrid (structural design using triangular tiling)
- List of uniform tilings
- Simplectic honeycomb
- Tilings of regular polygons
- Triangular tiling honeycomb

== Sources ==
- Coxeter, H.S.M. Regular Polytopes, (3rd edition, 1973), Dover edition, ISBN 0-486-61480-8 p. 296, Table II: Regular honeycombs
- Grünbaum, Branko & Shephard, G. C. (1987). Tilings and Patterns. New York: W. H. Freeman. ISBN 0-7167-1193-1. (Chapter 2.1: Regular and uniform tilings, p. 58-65, Chapter 2.9 Archimedean and Uniform colorings pp. 102–107)
- Williams, Robert (1979). The Geometrical Foundation of Natural Structure: A Source Book of Design. Dover Publications, Inc. ISBN 0-486-23729-X.

p35

- John H. Conway, Heidi Burgiel, Chaim Goodman-Strauss, The Symmetries of Things 2008, ISBN 978-1-56881-220-5

Fundamental convex regular and uniform honeycombs in dimensions 2–9
Space	Family	${\tilde{A}}_{n-1}$	${\tilde{C}}_{n-1}$	${\tilde{B}}_{n-1}$	${\tilde{D}}_{n-1}$	${\tilde{G}}_2$ / ${\tilde{F}}_4$ / ${\tilde{E}}_{n-1}$
E^{2}	Uniform tiling	0_{[3]}	δ_{3}	hδ_{3}	qδ_{3}	Hexagonal
E^{3}	Uniform convex honeycomb	0_{[4]}	δ_{4}	hδ_{4}	qδ_{4}	
E^{4}	Uniform 4-honeycomb	0_{[5]}	δ_{5}	hδ_{5}	qδ_{5}	24-cell honeycomb
E^{5}	Uniform 5-honeycomb	0_{[6]}	δ_{6}	hδ_{6}	qδ_{6}	
E^{6}	Uniform 6-honeycomb	0_{[7]}	δ_{7}	hδ_{7}	qδ_{7}	2_{22}
E^{7}	Uniform 7-honeycomb	0_{[8]}	δ_{8}	hδ_{8}	qδ_{8}	1_{33} • 3_{31}
E^{8}	Uniform 8-honeycomb	0_{[9]}	δ_{9}	hδ_{9}	qδ_{9}	1_{52} • 2_{51} • 5_{21}
E^{9}	Uniform 9-honeycomb	0_{[10]}	δ_{10}	hδ_{10}	qδ_{10}	
E^{10}	Uniform 10-honeycomb	0_{[11]}	δ_{11}	hδ_{11}	qδ_{11}	
E^{n−1}	Uniform (n−1)-honeycomb	0_{[n]}	δ_{n}	hδ_{n}	qδ_{n}	1_{k2} • 2_{k1} • k_{21}
