= Trihexagonal tiling =

Tiling of a plane by regular hexagons and equilateral triangles

Trihexagonal tiling
Trihexagonal tiling
Type	Semiregular tiling
Vertex configuration	(3.6)^{2}
Schläfli symbol	r{6,3} or $\begin{Bmatrix} 6 \\ 3 \end{Bmatrix}$ h_{2}{6,3}
Wythoff symbol	2 | 6 3; 3 3 | 3
Coxeter diagram	=
Symmetry	p6m, [6,3], (*632)
Rotation symmetry	p6, [6,3]^{+}, (632) p3, [3^{[3]}]^{+}, (333)
Bowers acronym	That
Dual	Rhombille tiling
Properties	Vertex-transitive Edge-transitive

In geometry, the trihexagonal tiling is one of 11 uniform tilings of the Euclidean plane by regular polygons. It consists of equilateral triangles and regular hexagons, arranged so that each hexagon is surrounded by triangles and vice versa. The name derives from the fact that it combines a regular hexagonal tiling and a regular triangular tiling. Two hexagons and two triangles alternate around each vertex, and its edges form an infinite arrangement of lines. Its dual is the rhombille tiling.

This pattern, and its place in the classification of uniform tilings, was already known to Johannes Kepler in his 1619 book Harmonices Mundi. The pattern has long been used in Japanese basketry, where it is called kagome. The Japanese term for this pattern has been taken up in physics, where it is called a kagome lattice. It occurs also in the crystal structures of certain minerals. Conway calls it a hexadeltille, combining alternate elements from a hexagonal tiling (hextille) and triangular tiling (deltille).

== Kagome ==
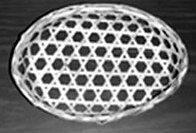
Japanese basket showing the kagome pattern

Kagome (Japanese: 籠目) is a traditional Japanese woven bamboo pattern; its name is composed from the words kago, meaning "basket", and me, meaning "eye(s)", referring to the pattern of holes in a woven basket.

The kagome pattern is common in bamboo weaving in East Asia. In 2022, archaeologists found bamboo weaving remains at the Dongsunba ruins in Chongqing, China, 200 BC. After 2200 years, the kagome pattern is still clear.

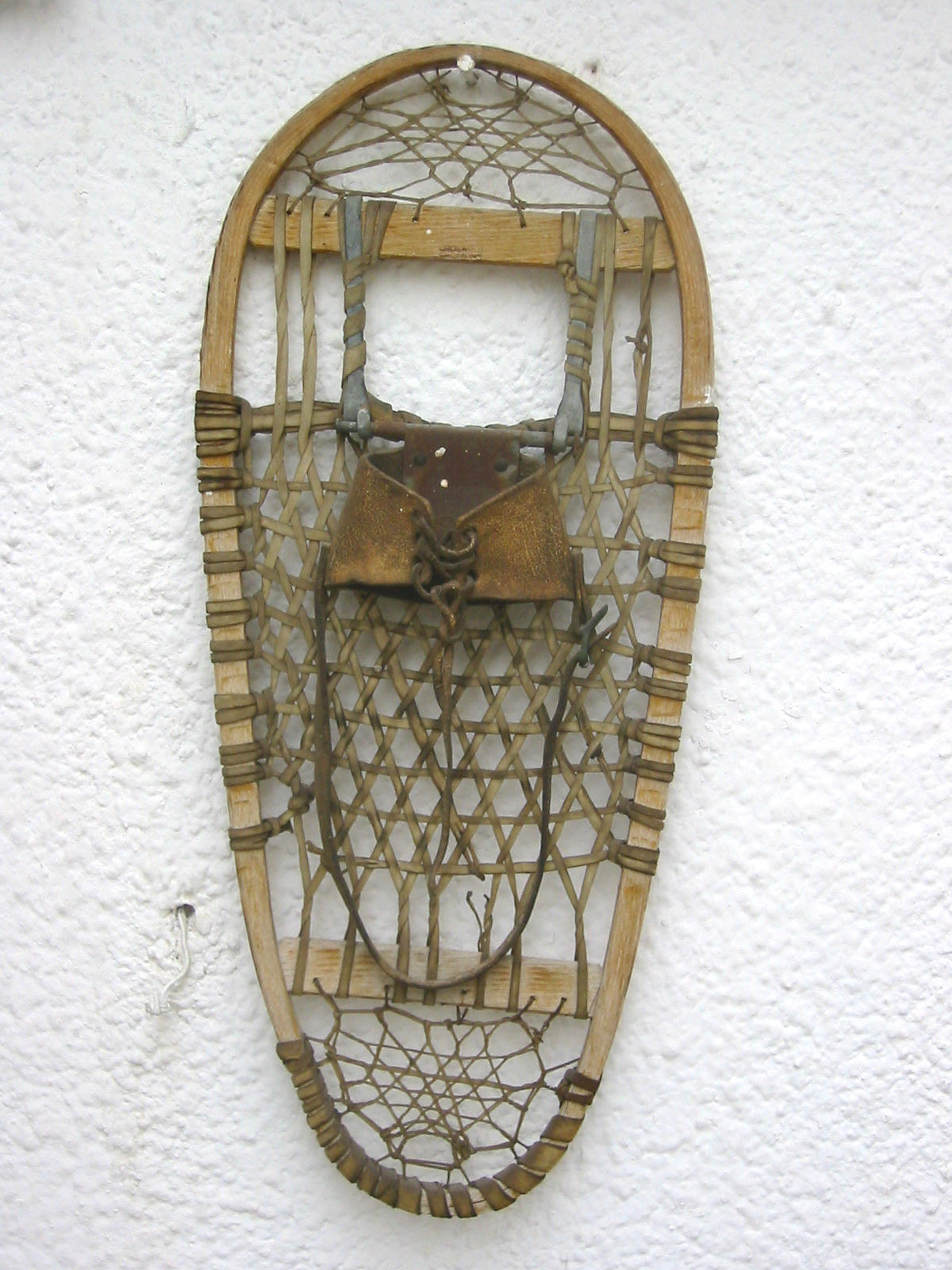
Inuit snowshoe Tagluk

Kagome pattern in detail

It is a woven arrangement of laths composed of interlaced triangles such that each point where two laths cross has four neighboring points, forming the pattern of a trihexagonal tiling. The woven process gives the Kagome a chiral wallpaper group symmetry, p6 (632).

== Kagome lattice ==
The term kagome lattice was coined by the Japanese physicist Kôdi Husimi, and first appeared in a 1951 paper by his assistant Ichirō Shōji. The kagome lattice in this sense consists of the vertices and edges of the trihexagonal tiling. Despite the name, these crossing points do not form a mathematical lattice.

A related three-dimensional structure formed by the vertices and edges of the quarter cubic honeycomb, filling space by regular tetrahedra and truncated tetrahedra, has been called a hyper-kagome lattice. It is represented by the vertices and edges of the quarter cubic honeycomb, filling space by regular tetrahedra and truncated tetrahedra. It contains four sets of parallel planes of points and lines, each plane being a two dimensional kagome lattice. A second expression in three dimensions has parallel layers of two dimensional lattices and is called an orthorhombic-kagome lattice. The trihexagonal prismatic honeycomb represents its edges and vertices.

Some minerals, namely jarosites and herbertsmithite, contain two-dimensional layers or three-dimensional kagome lattice arrangements of atoms in their crystal structure. These minerals display novel physical properties connected with geometrically frustrated magnetism. For instance, the spin arrangement of the magnetic ions in Co_{3}V_{2}O_{8} rests in a kagome lattice which exhibits fascinating magnetic behavior at low temperatures. Quantum magnets realized on Kagome metals have been discovered to exhibit many unexpected electronic and magnetic phenomena. It is also proposed that SYK behavior can be observed in two dimensional kagome lattice with impurities.

The term is much in use nowadays in the scientific literature, especially by theorists studying the magnetic properties of a theoretical kagome lattice.

=== Models on the kagome lattice ===
The physical interest of the kagome lattice stems from its corner-sharing triangles: three antiferromagnetically coupled spins on a triangle cannot all be pairwise antiparallel, and since the triangles share only corners, this geometrical frustration does not propagate into a rigid order of the whole lattice but leaves a macroscopically large number of degenerate low-energy configurations.

Shōji solved the Ising model on the kagome lattice exactly in 1951 by relating it to the honeycomb lattice through a star–triangle transformation; the ferromagnetic case has a phase transition at $k_\mathrm{B} T_c/J = 4/\ln(3+2\sqrt{3}) \approx 2.143$. The antiferromagnetic Ising model, by contrast, does not order at any temperature and retains a finite residual entropy down to zero temperature.

The spin-½ Heisenberg antiferromagnet on the kagome lattice is one of the most studied models of frustrated magnetism and a leading candidate for a quantum spin liquid ground state without magnetic order. Density matrix renormalization group calculations point to a gapped spin liquid, and inelastic neutron scattering on herbertsmithite shows a continuum of fractionalized excitations instead of the sharp spin waves of an ordered magnet.

For electrons hopping between nearest neighbours, the band structure of the kagome lattice contains, besides two dispersive bands touching at Dirac points, a completely flat band: destructive interference around the hexagons allows localized states whose energy is independent of momentum, so that interactions dominate over kinetic energy. This makes the lattice a model system for flat-band ferromagnetism and correlated electron phases. In the doped Hubbard model with strong repulsion, the frustration of electron motion produces self-trapped polarons of resonating valence bonds.

== Symmetry ==
30-60-90 triangle fundamental domains of p6m (*632) symmetry

The trihexagonal tiling has Schläfli symbol of r{6,3}, or Coxeter diagram,, symbolizing the fact that it is a rectified hexagonal tiling, {6,3}. Its symmetries can be described by the wallpaper group p6mm, (*632), and the tiling can be derived as a Wythoff construction within the reflectional fundamental domains of this group. The trihexagonal tiling is a quasiregular tiling, alternating two types of polygons, with vertex configuration (3.6)^{2}. It is also a uniform tiling, one of eight derived from the regular hexagonal tiling.

=== Uniform colorings ===
There are two distinct uniform colorings of a trihexagonal tiling. Naming the colors by indices on the 4 faces around a vertex (3.6.3.6): 1212, 1232. The second is called a cantic hexagonal tiling, h_{2}{6,3}, with two colors of triangles, existing in p3m1 (*333) symmetry.

Symmetry	p6m, (*632)	p3m, (*333)
Coloring		
fundamental domain		
Wythoff	2 | 6 3	3 3 | 3
Coxeter		=
Schläfli	r{6,3}	r{3^{[3]}} = h_{2}{6,3}

=== Circle packing ===
The trihexagonal tiling can be used as a circle packing, placing equal diameter circles at the center of every point. Every circle is in contact with 4 other circles in the packing (kissing number).

== Topologically equivalent tilings ==
The trihexagonal tiling can be geometrically distorted into topologically equivalent tilings of lower symmetry. In these variants of the tiling, the edges do not necessarily line up to form straight lines.

p3m1, (*333)	p3, (333)	p31m, (3*3)	cmm, (2*22)

== Related quasiregular tilings ==
The trihexagonal tiling exists in a sequence of symmetries of quasiregular tilings with vertex configurations (3.n)^{2}, progressing from tilings of the sphere to the Euclidean plane and into the hyperbolic plane. With orbifold notation symmetry of *n32 all of these tilings are wythoff construction within a fundamental domain of symmetry, with generator points at the right angle corner of the domain.

*n32 orbifold symmetries of quasiregular tilings: (3.n)^{2}
Construction	Spherical			Euclidean	Hyperbolic		
Construction	*332	*432	*532	*632	*732	*832...	*∞32
Quasiregular figures							
Vertex	(3.3)^{2}	(3.4)^{2}	(3.5)^{2}	(3.6)^{2}	(3.7)^{2}	(3.8)^{2}	(3.∞)^{2}

== Related regular complex apeirogons ==
There are 2 regular complex apeirogons, sharing the vertices of the trihexagonal tiling. Regular complex apeirogons have vertices and edges, where edges can contain 2 or more vertices. Regular apeirogons p{q}r are constrained by: 1/p + 2/q + 1/r = 1. Edges have p vertices arranged like a regular polygon, and vertex figures are r-gonal.

The first is made of triangular edges, two around every vertex, second has hexagonal edges, two around every vertex.

3{12}2 or	6{6}2 or

== See also ==
- Percolation threshold
- Kagome crest
- Star of David
- Trihexagonal prismatic honeycomb
- Cyclotruncated simplectic honeycomb
- List of uniform tilings
