= Heisenberg model =

Heisenberg model can refer to two models in statistical mechanics:

- Heisenberg model (classical), a classical nearest neighbour spin model
- Heisenberg model (quantum), a model where the spins are treated quantum mechanically using Pauli matrices
