= Rhombille tiling =

Tiling of the plane with 60° rhombi

- Type: Laves tiling
- Wallpaper group: p6m, [6,3], *632 p3m1, [3^{[3]}], *333
- Rotation group: p6, [6,3]^{+}, (632) p3, [3^{[3]}]^{+}, (333)
- Dual: Trihexagonal tiling
- Face configuration: V3.6.3.6
- Properties: edge-transitive, face-transitive

In geometry, the rhombille tiling, also known as tumbling blocks, reversible cubes, or the dice lattice, is a tessellation of identical 60° rhombi on the Euclidean plane. Each rhombus has two 60° and two 120° angles; rhombi with this shape are sometimes also called diamonds. Sets of three rhombi meet at their 120° angles, and sets of six rhombi meet at their 60° angles.

== Properties ==
Rhombus unit for the rhombille tiling dual to unit-length trihexagonal tiling.

Two hexagonal tilings with red and blue edges within rhombille tiling

Four hexagonal tilings with red, green, blue, and magenta edges within the rhombille tiling

The rhombille tiling can be seen as a subdivision of a hexagonal tiling with each hexagon divided into three rhombi meeting at the center point of the hexagon. This subdivision represents a regular compound tiling. It can also be seen as a subdivision of four hexagonal tilings with each hexagon divided into 12 rhombi.

The diagonals of each rhomb are in the ratio 1:√3. This is the dual tiling of the trihexagonal tiling or kagome lattice. As the dual to a uniform tiling, it is one of eleven possible Laves tilings, and in the face configuration for monohedral tilings it is denoted [3.6.3.6].

It is also one of 56 possible isohedral tilings by quadrilaterals, and one of only eight tilings of the plane in which every edge lies on a line of symmetry of the tiling.

It is possible to embed the rhombille tiling into a subset of a three-dimensional integer lattice, consisting of the points (x,y,z) with |x + y + z| ≤ 1, in such a way that two vertices are adjacent if and only if the corresponding lattice points are at unit distance from each other, and more strongly such that the number of edges in the shortest path between any two vertices of the tiling is the same as the Manhattan distance between the corresponding lattice points. Thus, the rhombille tiling can be viewed as an example of an infinite unit distance graph and partial cube.

== Artistic and decorative applications ==
The rhombille tiling can be interpreted as an isometric projection view of a set of cubes in two different ways, forming a reversible figure related to the Necker cube. In this context it is known as the "reversible cubes" illusion.

In the M. C. Escher artworks Metamorphosis I, Metamorphosis II, and Metamorphosis III Escher uses this interpretation of the tiling as a way of morphing between two- and three-dimensional forms. In another of his works, Cycle (1938), Escher played with the tension between the two-dimensionality and three-dimensionality of this tiling: in it he draws a building that has both large cubical blocks as architectural elements (drawn isometrically) and an upstairs patio tiled with the rhombille tiling. A human figure descends from the patio past the cubes, becoming more stylized and two-dimensional as he does so. These works involve only a single three-dimensional interpretation of the tiling, but in Convex and Concave Escher experiments with reversible figures more generally, and includes a depiction of the reversible cubes illusion on a flag within the scene.

The rhombille tiling is also used as a design for parquetry and for floor or wall tiling, sometimes with variations in the shapes of its rhombi. It appears in ancient Greek floor mosaics from Delos and from Italian floor tilings from the 11th century, although the tiles with this pattern in Siena Cathedral are of a more recent vintage. In quilting, it has been known since the 1850s as the "tumbling blocks" pattern, referring to the visual dissonance caused by its doubled three-dimensional interpretation. As a quilting pattern it also has many other names including cubework, heavenly stairs, and Pandora's box. It has been suggested that the tumbling blocks quilt pattern was used as a signal in the Underground Railroad: when slaves saw it hung on a fence, they were to box up their belongings and escape. See Quilts of the Underground Railroad. In these decorative applications, the rhombi may appear in multiple colors, but are typically given three levels of shading, brightest for the rhombs with horizontal long diagonals and darker for the rhombs with the other two orientations, to enhance their appearance of three-dimensionality. There is a single known instance of implicit rhombille and trihexagonal tiling in English heraldry – in the Geal/e arms.

== Other applications ==
The rhombille tiling may be viewed as the result of overlaying two different hexagonal tilings, translated so that some of the vertices of one tiling land at the centers of the hexagons of the other tiling. Thus, it can be used to define block cellular automata in which the cells of the automaton are the rhombi of a rhombille tiling and the blocks in alternating steps of the automaton are the hexagons of the two overlaid hexagonal tilings. In this context, it is called the "Q*bert neighborhood", after the video game Q*bert which featured an isometric view of a pyramid of cubes as its playing field. The Q*bert neighborhood may be used to support universal computation via a simulation of billiard ball computers.

In condensed matter physics, the rhombille tiling is known as the dice lattice, diced lattice, or dual kagome lattice. It is one of several repeating structures used to investigate Ising models and related systems of spin interactions in diatomic crystals, and it has also been studied in percolation theory.

== Related polyhedra and tilings ==
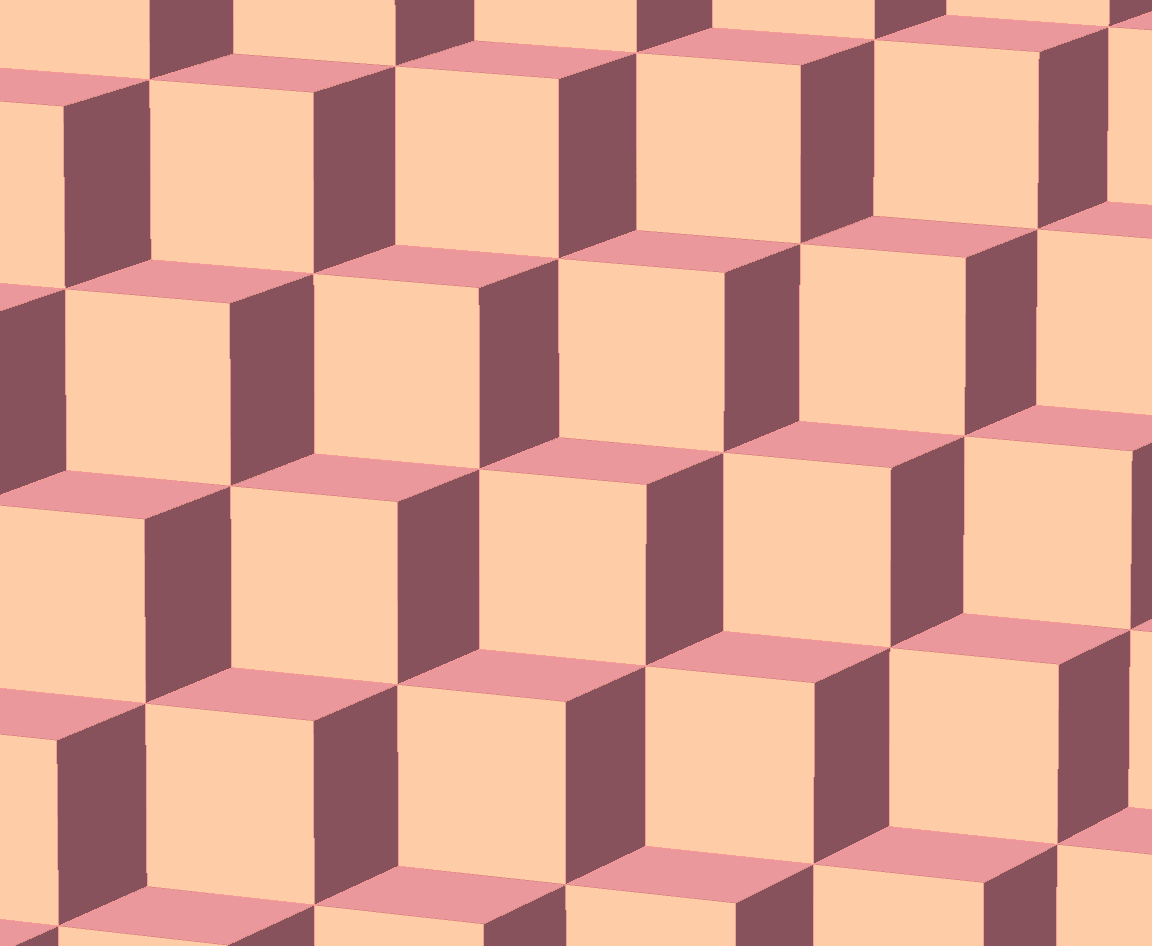
Combinatorially equivalent tilings by parallelograms

The rhombille tiling is the dual of the trihexagonal tiling. It is one of many different ways of tiling the plane by congruent rhombi. Others include a diagonally flattened variation of the square tiling (with translational symmetry on all four sides of the rhombi), the tiling used by the Miura-ori folding pattern (alternating between translational and reflectional symmetry), and the Penrose tiling which uses two kinds of rhombi with 36° and 72° acute angles aperiodically. When more than one type of rhombus is allowed, additional tilings are possible, including some that are topologically equivalent to the rhombille tiling but with lower symmetry.

Tilings combinatorially equivalent to the rhombille tiling can also be realized by parallelograms, and interpreted as axonometric projections of three dimensional cubic steps.

There are only eight edge tessellations, tilings of the plane with the property that reflecting any tile across any one of its edges produces another tile; one of them is the rhombille tiling.

== Examples ==
The rhombille tiling overlaid on its dual, the trihexagonal tiling.

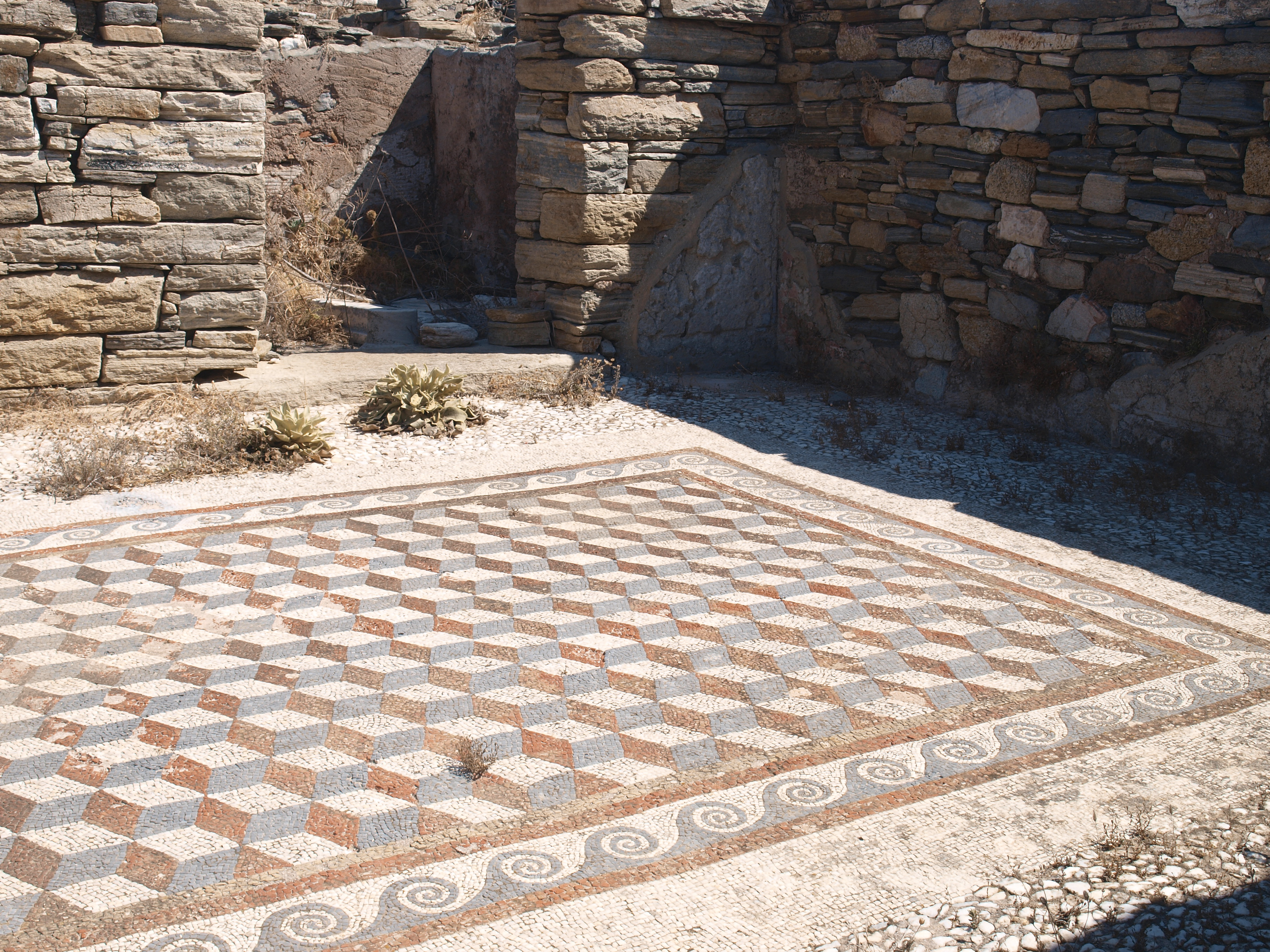
Rhombille tiling floor mosaic in Delos

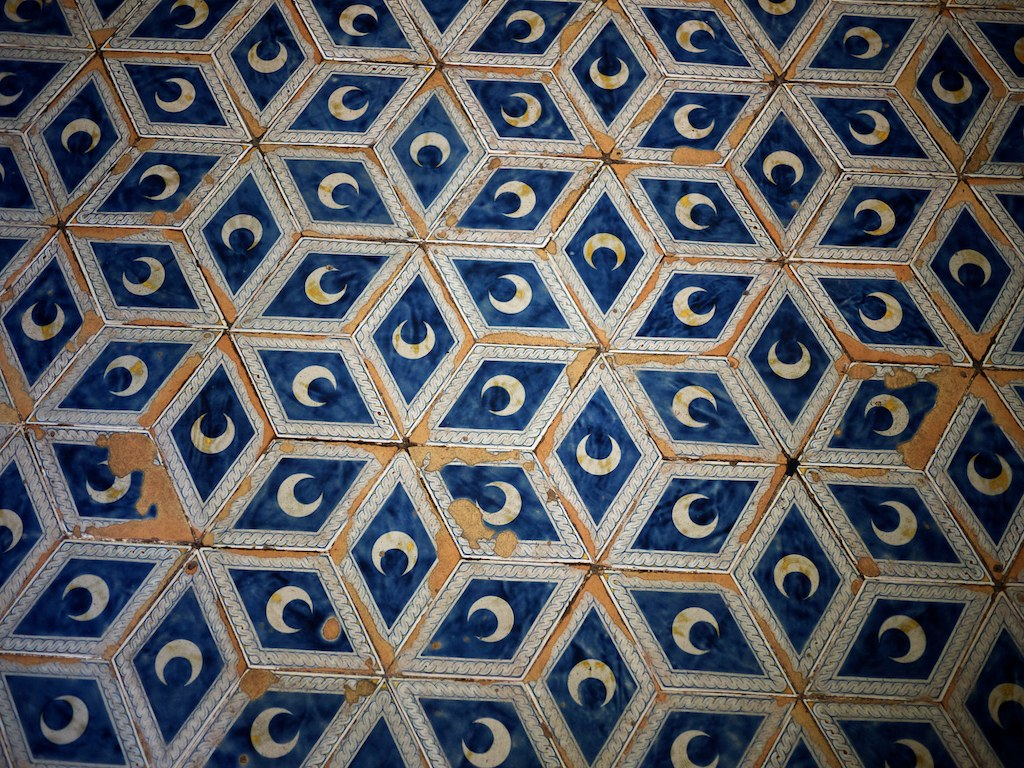
Rhombille tiling pattern on the floor of Siena Cathedral

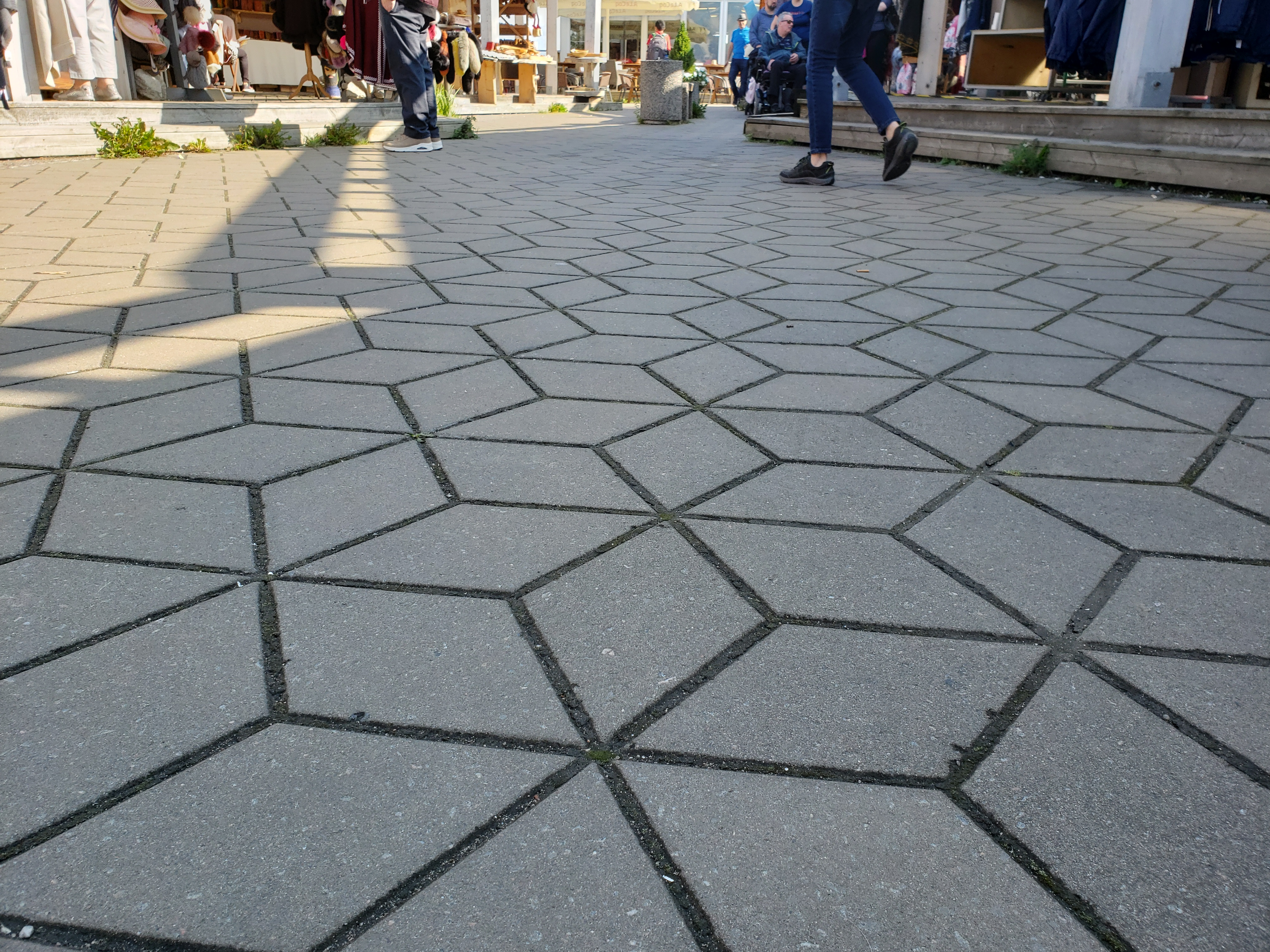
Rhombille tiling in cruise terminal in Tallinn, Estonia

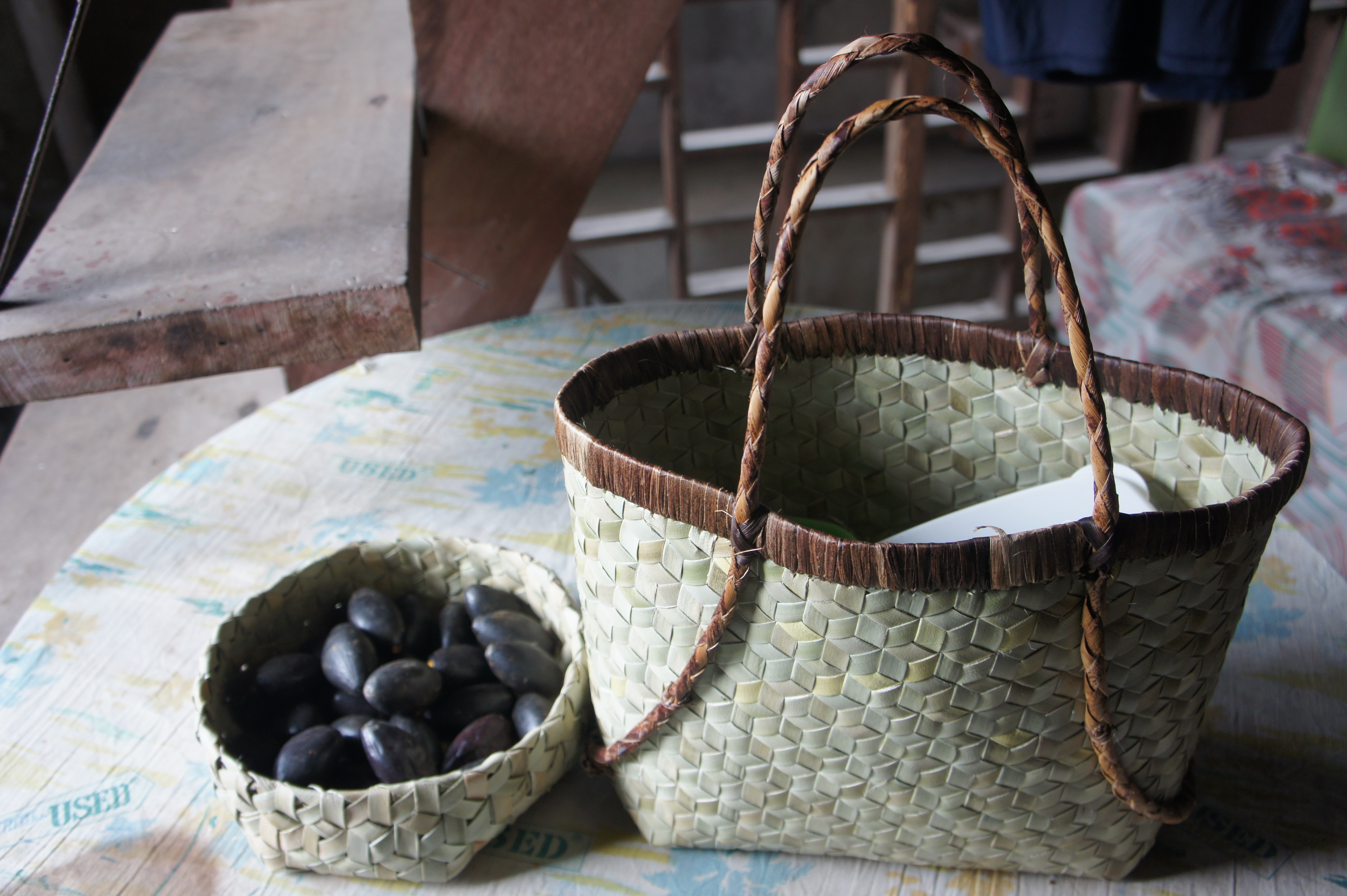
A bayong, a traditional Philippine basket woven from karagumoy (Pandanus simplex) leaves in the hexagonal kinab-anan pattern

== See also ==
- Tiling by regular polygons
