= List of planar symmetry groups =

This article summarizes the classes of discrete symmetry groups of the Euclidean plane. The symmetry groups are named here by three naming schemes: International notation, orbifold notation, and Coxeter notation. There are three kinds of symmetry groups of the plane:

- 2 families of rosette groups – 2D point groups
- 7 frieze groups – 2D line groups
- 17 wallpaper groups – 2D space groups.

== Rosette groups ==
There are two families of discrete two-dimensional point groups, and they are specified with parameter n, which is the order of the group of the rotations in the group.

Family	Intl (orbifold)	Schön.	Geo Coxeter	Order	Examples					
Cyclic symmetry	n (n•)	C_{n}	n̅ [n]^{+}	n	C_{1}, [ ]^{+} (•)	C_{2}, [2]^{+} (2•)	C_{3}, [3]^{+} (3•)	C_{4}, [4]^{+} (4•)	C_{5}, [5]^{+} (5•)	C_{6}, [6]^{+} (6•)
Dihedral symmetry	nm (*n•)	D_{n}	n [n]	2n	D_{1}, [ ] (*•)	D_{2}, [2] (*2•)	D_{3}, [3] (*3•)	D_{4}, [4] (*4•)	D_{5}, [5] (*5•)	D_{6}, [6] (*6•)

== Frieze groups ==
The 7 frieze groups, the two-dimensional line groups, with a direction of periodicity are given with five notational names. The Schönflies notation is given as infinite limits of 7 dihedral groups. The yellow regions represent the infinite fundamental domain in each.

[1,∞],
IUC (orbifold)	Geo	Schönflies	Coxeter	Fundamental domain	Example
p1m1 (*∞•)	p1	C_{∞v}	[1,∞]		sidle
p1 (∞•)	p1̅	C_{∞}	[1,∞]^{+}		hop

[2,∞^{+}],
IUC (orbifold)	Geo	Schönflies	Coxeter	Fundamental domain	Example
p11m (∞*)	p. 1	C_{∞h}	[2,∞^{+}]		jump
p11g (∞×)	p._{g}1	S_{2∞}	[2^{+},∞^{+}]		step

[2,∞],
IUC (orbifold)	Geo	Schönflies	Coxeter	Fundamental domain	Example
p2mm (*22∞)	p2	D_{∞h}	[2,∞]		spinning jump
p2mg (2*∞)	p2_{g}	D_{∞d}	[2^{+},∞]		spinning sidle
p2 (22∞)	p2̅	D_{∞}	[2,∞]^{+}		spinning hop

== Wallpaper groups ==
The 17 wallpaper groups, with finite fundamental domains, are given by International notation, orbifold notation, and Coxeter notation, classified by the 5 Bravais lattices in the plane: square, oblique (parallelogrammatic), hexagonal (equilateral triangular), rectangular (centered rhombic), and rhombic (centered rectangular).

The p1 and p2 groups, with no reflectional symmetry, are repeated in all classes. The related pure reflectional Coxeter group are given with all classes except oblique.

Square [4,4],
IUC (Orb.) Geo	Coxeter	Domain Conway name
p1 (°) p1̅		Monotropic
p2 (2222) p2̅	[4,1^{+},4]^{+} [1^{+},4,4,1^{+}]^{+}	Ditropic
pgg (22×) p_{g}2_{g}	[4^{+},4^{+}]	Diglide
pmm (*2222) p2	[4,1^{+},4] [1^{+},4,4,1^{+}]	Discopic
cmm (2*22) c2	[(4,4,2^{+})]	Dirhombic
p4 (442) p4̅	[4,4]^{+}	Tetratropic
p4g (4*2) p_{g}4	[4^{+},4]	Tetragyro
p4m (*442) p4	[4,4]	Tetrascopic

Rectangular [∞_{h},2,∞_{v}],
IUC (Orb.) Geo	Coxeter	Domain Conway name
p1 (°) p1̅	[∞^{+},2,∞^{+}]	Monotropic
p2 (2222) p2̅	[∞,2,∞]^{+}	Ditropic
pg(h) (××) p_{g}1	h: [∞^{+},(2,∞)^{+}]	Monoglide
pg(v) (××) p_{g}1	v: [(∞,2)^{+},∞^{+}]	Monoglide
pgm (22*) p_{g}2	h: [(∞,2)^{+},∞]	Digyro
pmg (22*) p_{g}2	v: [∞,(2,∞)^{+}]	Digyro
pm(h) (**) p1	h: [∞^{+},2,∞]	Monoscopic
pm(v) (**) p1	v: [∞,2,∞^{+}]	Monoscopic
pmm (*2222) p2	[∞,2,∞]	Discopic

Rhombic [∞_{h},2^{+},∞_{v}],
IUC (Orb.) Geo	Coxeter	Domain Conway name
p1 (°) p1̅	[∞^{+},2^{+},∞^{+}]	Monotropic
p2 (2222) p2̅	[∞,2^{+},∞]^{+}	Ditropic
cm(h) (*×) c1	h: [∞^{+},2^{+},∞]	Monorhombic
cm(v) (*×) c1	v: [∞,2^{+},∞^{+}]	Monorhombic
pgg (22×) p_{g}2_{g}	[((∞,2)^{+})^{[2]}]	Diglide
cmm (2*22) c2	[∞,2^{+},∞]	Dirhombic

Parallelogrammatic (oblique)
p1 (°) p1̅	Monotropic
p2 (2222) p2̅	Ditropic

Hexagonal/Triangular [6,3], / [3^{[3]}],
IUC (Orb.) Geo	Coxeter	Domain Conway name
p1 (°) p1̅		Monotropic
p2 (2222) p2̅	[6,3]^{Δ}	Ditropic
cmm (2*22) c2	[6,3]^{⅄}	Dirhombic
p3 (333) p3̅	[1^{+},6,3^{+}] [3^{[3]}]^{+}	Tritropic
p3m1 (*333) p3	[1^{+},6,3] [3^{[3]}]	Triscopic
p31m (3*3) h3	[6,3^{+}]	Trigyro
p6 (632) p6̅	[6,3]^{+}	Hexatropic
p6m (*632) p6	[6,3]	Hexascopic

== Wallpaper subgroup relationships ==
Subgroup relationships among the 17 wallpaper group
		o	2222	××	**	*×	22×	22*	*2222	2*22	442	4*2	*442	333	*333	3*3	632	*632
		p1	p2	pg	pm	cm	pgg	pmg	pmm	cmm	p4	p4g	p4m	p3	p3m1	p31m	p6	p6m
o	p1	2																
2222	p2	2	2															
××	pg	2		2														
**	pm	2		2	2	2												
*×	cm	2		2	2	3												
22×	pgg	4	2	2			3											
22*	pmg	4	2	2	2	4	2	3										
*2222	pmm	4	2	4	2	4	4	2	2	2								
2*22	cmm	4	2	4	4	2	2	2	2	3								
442	p4	4	2								2							
4*2	p4g	8	4	4	8	4	2	4	4	2	2	9						
*442	p4m	8	4	8	4	4	4	4	2	2	2	2	2					
333	p3	3												3				
*333	p3m1	6		6	6	3								2	4	3		
3*3	p31m	6		6	6	3								2	3	4		
632	p6	6	3											2			4	
*632	p6m	12	6	12	12	6	6	6	6	3				4	2	2	2	3

== See also ==
- List of spherical symmetry groups
- Orbifold notation#Hyperbolic plane - Hyperbolic symmetry groups
