= HyperRogue =

Independent video game

- Developer: Zeno Rogue
- Composers: Shawn Parrotte; Will Savino; Lincoln Domina
- Platforms: Windows, OS X, Linux, iOS, Android, OpenPandora
- Release: WW: November, 2011
- Genre: Roguelike
- Mode: Single-player

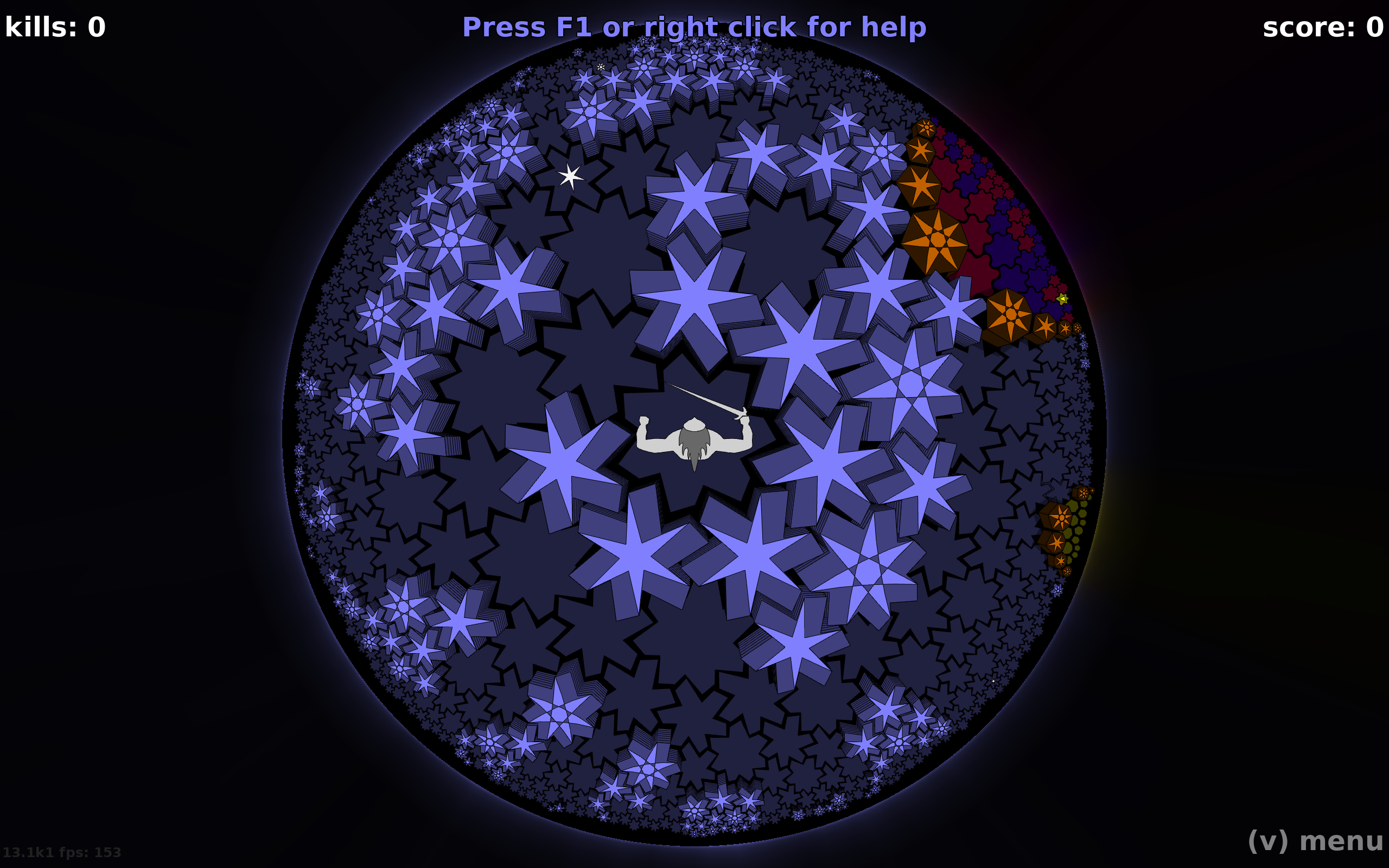
Beginning of a HyperRogue game

HyperRogue
- Written in: C++
- License: GPL-2.0 license
- Website: roguetemple.com/z/hyper/
- Repository: github.com/zenorogue/hyperrogue/

HyperRogue is a free and open-source independent video game developed by Zeno Rogue. It is a roguelike inspired by the puzzle game Deadly Rooms of Death and the art of M. C. Escher, taking place in the hyperbolic plane.

== Gameplay ==
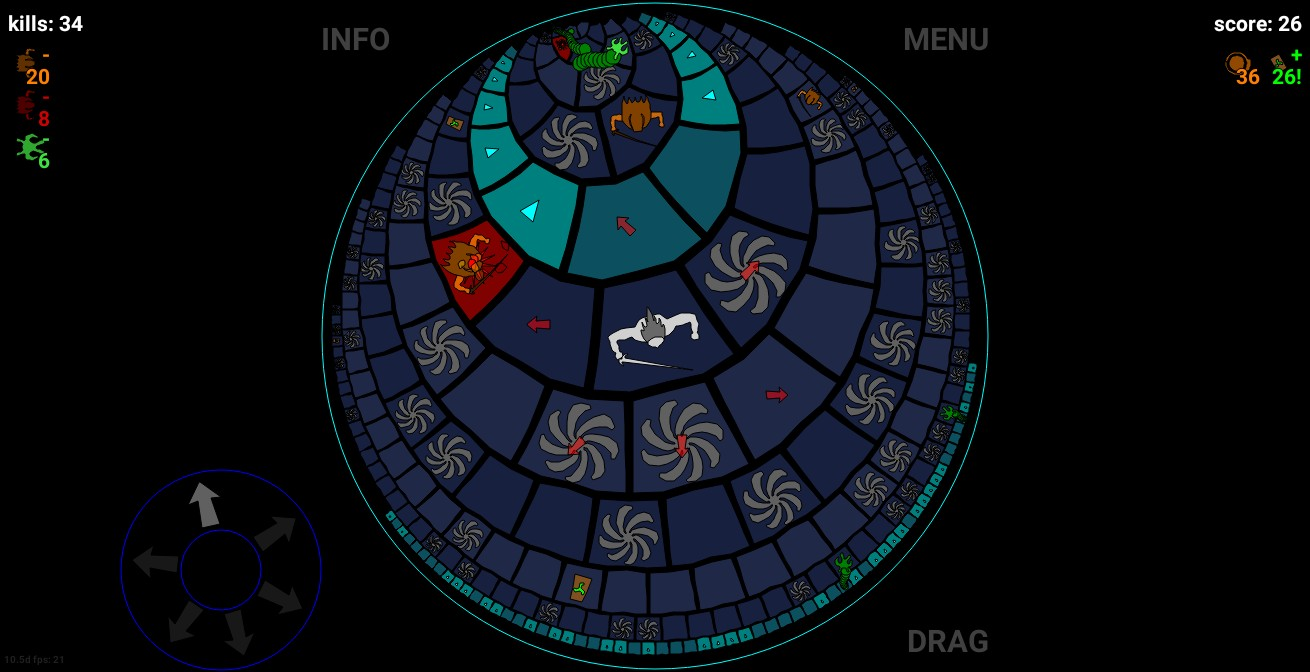
Screenshot of HyperRogue on mobile. The player is in the Temple of Cthulhu, a land featuring an infinite series of nested horocycles. The game is using the alternate binary tiling of the hyperbolic plane.

HyperRogue is a turn-based game in which the player controls one character exploring a world based on hyperbolic geometry, with cells arranged as a truncated order-7 triangular tiling by default (with a few exceptions). The player can also choose to play on some other tilings and honeycombs in two and three dimensions, in all eight Thurston geometries, along with a variety of quotient spaces. It borrows procedural generation and permadeath from the roguelike genre, and puzzle-based combat of Deadly Rooms of Death.

The world consists of 72 lands, each of which has a different theme, treasure, enemies, mechanics, and a magical power; the lands are usually separated by hyperbolic straight lines ("Great Walls") and change as one travels, thus allowing monsters and magical powers to interact between the different lands. The world is procedurally generated on the fly; some of the lands must be unlocked by fulfilling a prerequisite in the given play (e.g., collecting a certain number of treasures).

The main goal of the game is to collect treasures while avoiding entrapment by enemies. Other than simply collecting the treasures, there are several major quests to undertake (Yendor quest, Prince(ss) quest, Hyperstone Quest and the Holy Grail).

The gameplay is inspired by Deadly Rooms of Death. The basic enemies alternate their turns with the player; in their turn, the player or an enemy can stay in place, move or attack an adjacent cell. The player and basic enemies can be killed with a single hit. Similar to the check rule in chess, the game does not allow the player to make moves which would lead them to be immediately killed. While defeating a single enemy is not a problem, tactical planning is essential for winning fights with multiple enemies at once. This basic formula is altered in many ways: there are monsters of varying speeds, multi-tile monsters such as Ivies, sandworms, snakes and dragons, and monsters which have to be attacked in a specific way.

The game has many special modes, allowing the player to take on a specific challenge (Pure Tactics Mode, Yendor Challenge), or changing a crucial aspect of the game (Chaos Mode where lands change very quickly as you travel, Shoot'em Up Mode which is continuous rather than turn-based and grid-based, and Orb Strategy Mode where orbs can be used at any time instead of being picked up in the world). The source code also contains a visualization engine, called RogueViz.

== Hyperbolic geometry ==
The world of HyperRogue is characterized by its hyperbolic geometry, which affects many aspects of the game. The game is displayed in the Poincaré disk model by default; it is also possible to select other projections from the special modes menu. The graphics are inspired by the art of M. C. Escher, particularly the Circle Limit series using hyperbolic geometry.

One property of hyperbolic geometry is that the amount of cells in distance at most d from the starting point is exponential in d; there are centillions of cells in distance 1000 from the starting point. This makes the world of HyperRogue substantially bigger than Euclidean space. The traditional RPG formula of getting stronger by collecting equipment had to be changed to make grinding strategies ineffective. New lands and magical powers are unlocked by collecting treasures, but on the other hand, the amount of monsters spawning depends on the number of treasures collected in the given land, thus making it impossible to grind indefinitely.

Many challenges in the game would be trivial in a Euclidean world, but are made harder by the exponential expansion of the hyperbolic plane. At the same time, other challenges would be practically impossible in Euclidean, but are relatively easy in the hyperbolic world. Getting to the center of a moderately-sized circle and returning to one's prior location are almost impossible in hyperbolic geometry, while both are much easier in Euclidean geometry.

Obstacles and other objects in the game world use shapes that are impossible in Euclidean geometry, like infinite trees, equidistants and horocycles, and straight lines which never cross. There is also one land that relies on the holonomy of hyperbolic geometry: when the player returns to a tile after making a few steps in a closed loop, the world has rotated around the player.

The in-game tutorial allows the player to learn about hyperbolic geometry and the game's basic mechanics.

== Release ==
The first version of HyperRogue, then named Hyperbolic Rogue, was created in November 2011, and contained only a single land and very simple monsters. A new version was made in March 2012 for the Seven Day Roguelike Challenge, with more lands and the introduction of magical orbs. In January 2015, HyperRogue was released on Steam.

Version 12.0, released in June 2021, added support for virtual reality through SteamVR.

== Reception ==
HyperRogue was called "one of the most interesting roguelikes to come around lately" in the book Exploring Roguelike Games. Pocket Tactics stated that it was reminiscent of Roger Zelazny's Chronicles of Amber series.
