= Heesch =

Heesch can refer to:

- Heesch, Netherlands, a town in the Bernheze municipality
- Heinrich Heesch (1906–1995), German mathematician
- Heesch's problem in mathematics
