= James W. McRae =

American engineer

James W. McRae (October 25, 1910 – February 2, 1960) was an American engineer who served as the third president of Sandia Corporation (a subsidiary of Bell Labs which managed the Sandia Laboratory). Prior to serving as director, he was vice president of the American Telephone and Telegraph Company.

== Early life and career ==
McRae was born on October 25, 1910, in Vancouver, Canada, and graduated from the University of British Columbia in 1933 with a B.S. in electrical engineering. He received a doctorate from the California Institute of Technology in 1937 and subsequently joined Bell Telephone Laboratories, working on technology for microwave and radio transmitters. In 1942, he joined the U.S. Army Signal Corps where he worked as a commissioned officer, eventually serving as deputy director of the "Engineering Staff of the Signal Corps Engineering Laboratories". McRae returned to Bell Labs in 1946 where he held several director positions before being appointed as vice president of systems development in 1951. In 1953, he served as president of the Institute of Radio Engineers. In September 1953, he was appointed president of Sandia Corporation; a position he held until October 1958. He subsequently returned to Madison, New Jersey, where he served as vice president of AT&T until his death on February 2, 1960, at the age of 49.

== See also ==
- Smith chart
