= Jennifer McLoud-Mann =

American mathematician

- Education: East Central University (BS, 1997); University of Arkansas (MS, 1998; PhD, 2002)
- Spouse: Casey Mann
- Scientific career
- Institutions: University of Washington Bothell; University of Texas at Tyler
- Thesis: On a Certain Family of Determinantal-Like Ideals (2002)
- Doctoral advisor: Mark Ray Johnson
- Website: https://faculty.washington.edu/jmcloud/

Jennifer McLoud-Mann is an American mathematician known for her 2015 discovery, with Casey Mann and undergraduate student David Von Derau, of the 15th and last class of convex pentagons to tile the plane. She is a professor of mathematics at the University of Washington Bothell, where she is currently the Vice Dean of Curriculum & Instruction of the School of STEM. Beyond tiling, her research interests include knot theory, tiling theory, and combinatorics.

== Early life and education ==
McLoud-Mann grew up in Weleetka, Oklahoma. As a member of the Cherokee Nation, she participated in the Oklahoma Louis Stokes Alliance for Minority Participation and McNair Scholars at East Central University. She graduated from East Central University in 1997 with a B.S. degree in Mathematics. She is the first person in her family to earn a bachelor's degree. She completed a M.S. in Mathematics at the University of Arkansas in 1998.

McLoud-Mann completed her Ph.D. in 2002 from the University of Arkansas. Her dissertation in commutative algebra, supervised by Mark Ray Johnson, was titled On a Certain Family of Determinantal-Like Ideals.

== Career ==
Upon completing her doctorate, McLoud-Mann joined the University of Texas at Tyler faculty. In addition, she was associate dean of arts and sciences from 2009 to 2013.

In 2013, she moved to the University of Washington Bothell where she chaired the School of STEM's Engineering & Mathematics division for three years. In September 2020, she became the Associate Dean of Curriculum & Instruction for the School of STEM.

After two years of research, McLoud-Mann and research co-director Casey Mann found the 15th kind of pentagon that can tile a plane. This discovery was facilitated by undergraduate researcher David Von Derau, who automated an algorithm developed by McLoud-Mann and Mann. It was the first tile discovery in 30 years.

== Awards ==
McLoud-Mann won the Henry L. Alder Award for Distinguished Teaching by a Beginning College or University Mathematics Faculty Member of the Mathematical Association of America in 2008. In 2016, she was the recipient of the Distinguished Research, Scholarship, and Creative Activity award, which recognizes scholarly or creative achievement exemplifying the research-intensive education environment of the University of Washington Bothell.

== Personal life ==
She was the first in her family to obtain a college degree. She is married to Casey Mann.
