= Casey Mann =

American mathematician

A polygon with Heesch number 5, found by Casey Mann

Casey Mann is an American mathematician, specializing in discrete and computational geometry, in particular tessellation and knot theory. He is Professor of Mathematics at University of Washington Bothell, and received the PhD at the University of Arkansas in 2001.

He is known for his 2015 discovery, with Jennifer McLoud-Mann and undergraduate student David Von Derau, of the 15th and last class of convex pentagons to tile the plane.

Mann is also known for his work on Heesch's problem, to which he contributed a polygon with Heesch number 5. This problem is closely related to the einstein problem, of whether there exists a shape that can tessellate space, but only in a non-periodic way.

== Education and career ==
Mann received his B.S. in mathematics at East Central University in Ada, Oklahoma, and completed his Ph.D. in 2001 from the University of Arkansas. His dissertation in discrete geometry, supervised by Chaim Goodman-Strauss, was Heesch's Problem and Other Tiling Problems.

Upon completing his doctorate, Mann joined the University of Texas at Tyler faculty for eleven years.. He joined the faculty of University of Washington Bothell in 2013, where he is active in engaging undergraduate students in research.
