= Deadly Rooms of Death =

1996 video game

- Developer: Webfoot Technologies
- Publisher: Webfoot Technologies
- Producer: Dana Dominiak
- Designer: Erik Hermansen
- Composer: Lars Kristian Aasbrenn
- Platforms: Windows, Linux, Mac OS
- Release: 1996
- Genre: Puzzle
- Mode: Single-player

Deadly Rooms of Death (DROD) is a puzzle video game created by Erik Hermansen in 1996. The original version of the game was published by Webfoot Technologies. In 2000 the author reacquired the rights from Webfoot and released the source code; he continues the support and development as Caravel DROD.

== Plot ==
DROD's story centers around Beethro Budkin, a professional dungeon-delving pest exterminator. Beethro is called to the castle by King Dugan, who explains that the castle guards, having been allowed to take their meals in the dungeon, have left crumbs everywhere and invited hordes of pests into the dungeon. Equipped with a sword, Beethro is sent down into the dungeon to clear the pests.

== Gameplay ==
The game is entirely tile-based and takes place on a 38×32 rectangular grid. Most monsters and objects take up a single tile, though some monsters (such as serpents) take up multiple connected tiles. Each room is a separate puzzle, and to solve it the player must defeat all the monsters in the room and exit it. The player controls the movement of Beethro Budkin, a dungeon exterminator equipped with a "Really Big Sword". In the fictional world where the game takes place (the Eighth), his job as a Smitemaster is to clear dungeons of invading monsters. Most gameplay stems from, or elaborates on, this concept.

Since the game is also turn-based, monsters or objects will only move once per turn. Each type of monster has a different algorithm for its movement, depending on its location relative to the player. As a result, Deadly Rooms of Death requires logical problem-solving rather than reflexes. Each turn, the player can wait, move Beethro into any of the eight bordering squares to his current one (if not already occupied), or rotate his sword 45 degrees. Some rooms simply require finding a sequence of moves that allows Beethro to defeat all monsters without being killed; other rooms require solving more complex puzzles, thanks to game elements such as orbs that open and close doors, trapdoors that fall after being stepped on, and so forth.

== Development ==
The game was developed by Erik Hermansen. In 1996, the game was commercially released by Webfoot Technologies as version 1.03 of the game. The release was followed shortly after with versions 1.04 and 1.11 to fix some bugs with unsolvable rooms and levels. This early version is commonly known as Webfoot DROD. As the game was commercially unsuccessful, the publisher stopped distributing the game around 1999.

=== Remakes ===
In 2000, the original author of the game got permission from Webfoot to open-source the game and he released the source code under the Mozilla Public License 1.1. With the help of several volunteers, he recreated the game from scratch, rewriting the entire game engine and creating improved graphics and new music for it. The main game screen, however, remained mostly the same as the original Webfoot version. This version, version 1.5, is commonly known as Caravel DROD, and was first released in late October 2002.

Version 1.6, also called DROD: Architects' Edition, included improvements to some of the graphics, but most importantly a level editor, and was released in 2003. Community-designed rooms and levels are grouped together in packages called "holds", and extend the gameplay beyond the community-imposed challenges of previous versions.

A commercial remake of the original DROD game was also released under this engine, named DROD: King Dugan's Dungeon. Several commercial add-on holds have also been released for this engine as 'Smitemaster's Selections', such as "The Choice" (2005), "Perfection" (2005), "Halph Stories" (2005), "Beethro's Teacher" (2006), "Journeys End" (2006), "Devilishly Dangerous Dungeons of Doom" (2008), "Smitemaster for Hire" (2009), "Truthlock Method" (2011), "Flood Warning" (2012), "Treacle Stew" (2022).

An Adobe Flash version consisting of an updated version of King Dugan's Dungeon was released in June 2012. Currently, there are 5 "Episodes".

=== Sequels ===
The second game in the series, DROD: Journey to Rooted Hold, was released on April 1, 2005 for Windows, Linux, and Mac. It follows Beethro, whose nephew suddenly ran off. While searching for Halph, Beethro ended up under the world's surface, being chased by a fiend. Everything is viewed from a top-down perspective, and the player is able to see the monsters and other objects in each room visited. Each level is designed so that there is only one way in and out. The movement is turn-based, meaning that each time a button is pressed, Beethro will move by one step in the desired direction. As soon as an action is done, the nearby foes will make their move as well. Since there are no hit points, any contact with enemies or traps will result in a life loss. Also called DROD 2.0, the game includes many new additions and improvements, such as an expanded plot complete with in-game dialogue, higher resolution graphics; better user interfaces in both the editor and in game; new monsters and puzzle elements; additional customizability for holds, scripting system and connectivity to an online DROD database.

The third game in the series, DROD: The City Beneath, or DROD 3.0, was released in April 2007. It includes all the features of Journey to Rooted Hold, plus a complete new official hold with in-game dialog, three new design styles, and further enhanced customizability and networking. Cut scene support, a ray-traced lighting system and variables that allow non-linear plot progression are the most prominent new features of DROD:TCB.

As an extra game, DROD RPG was released on September 12, 2008. Created by Mike Rimer, DROD RPG is a DROD game coupled with several RPG elements including hitpoints, equipment, and the ability to change weapons. The game takes the DROD franchise in a new direction and features a new character, Tendry, a member of the stalwart army, who tries to find his way to the surface world. Some of the older puzzle elements were changed to reflect the RPG style, including keys to open doors that used to open under other conditions.

A fifth game named DROD 4: Gunthro and the Epic Blunder was released April 1, 2012 - it included a couple of new game elements, and three new graphical and music styles, as well as the inclusion of some more scripting capabilities. DROD 4 is a prequel to the original story, and, although it was released after the others, is set before the "Journey to Rooted Hold".

A sixth game, titled DROD 5: The Second Sky, was released on June 21, 2014. This is the conclusion to the story of Beethro. It features new weapon types, overworld maps, and additional scripting, sound and voice support.

== Reception ==
DROD has the highest rating amongst puzzle games listed at Home of the Underdogs, and was recommended by Ed Pegg Jr. of the Mathematical Association of America and Tony Delgado of GameSetWatch.

== See also ==
- HyperRogue
