= Phillip Hagar Smith =

American electrical engineer

Phillip Hagar Smith (29 April 1905 – 29 August 1987) was an American electrical engineer, who became famous for his invention of the Smith chart.

== Life ==
Smith was born in Lexington, Massachusetts in 1905, and graduated from Tufts College in 1928 with a BS degree in electrical engineering. While working for Bell Telephone Laboratories, he invented his eponymous Smith chart (which was also invented independently in 1937 by Tōsaku Mizuhashi (水橋東作) and in 1939 by Amiel R. Volpert (Амиэ́ль Р. Во́льперт)). He retired from Bell Labs in 1970.

The IEEE History Center conducted an interview with Smith in 1973, the edited transcript and audio clips from which are on the web.

Smith died in Berkeley Heights, New Jersey in 1987.

== Inventions ==
When asked why he invented the chart, Smith explained, "From the time I could operate a slide rule, I've been interested in graphical representations of mathematical relationships." In 1969 he published the book Electronic Applications of the Smith Chart: In Waveguide, Circuit, and Component Analysis, a comprehensive work on the subject.

Although best known for his Smith chart, he made important contributions in a variety of fields, including radar, FM, and antennas (including use of the Lüneburg lens).

== Honors ==
He was elected a fellow of the Institute of Radio Engineers in 1952.

As a pioneering radio amateur, Smith held a rare early callsign 1ANB.
