= Geometric symmetry (book) =

Mathematics book

- Cover page of the first edition
- Author: E.H. Lockwood and R.H. Macmillan
- Language: English
- Subject: Geometry, symmetry
- Publisher: Cambridge University Press
- Publication date: 1978
- Publication place: United Kingdom
- Media type: Print
- Pages: 228
- ISBN: 978-0-521-21685-2
- Dewey Decimal: 516.1
- LC Class: QA447.L63
- Text: Geometric symmetry at Internet Archive

Geometric symmetry is a book by mathematician E.H. Lockwood and design engineer R.H. Macmillan published by Cambridge University Press in 1978. The subject matter of the book is symmetry and geometry.

== Structure and topics ==
The book is divided into two parts. The first part (chapters 1-13) is largely descriptive and written for the non-mathematical reader. The second part (chapters 14-27) is more mathematical, but only elementary geometrical knowledge is assumed.

In the first part the authors describe and illustrate the following topics: symmetry elements, frieze patterns, wallpaper patterns, and rod, layer and space patterns. The first part also introduces the concepts of continuous, dilation, dichromatic and polychromatic symmetry.

In the second part the authors revisit all of the topics from the first part; but in more detail, and with greater mathematical rigour. Group theory and symmetry are the foundations of the material in the second part of the book. A detailed analysis of the subject matter is given in the appendix below.

The book is printed in two colours, red and black, to facilitate the identification of colour symmetry in patterns.

== Audience ==
In the preface the authors state: "In this book we attempt to provide a fairly comprehensive account of symmetry in a form acceptable to readers without much mathematical knowledge [...] The treatment is geometrical which should appeal to art students and to readers whose mathematical interests are that way inclined." However, Joseph H. Gehringer in a review in The Mathematics Teacher commented "Clearly not intended as a popular treatment of symmetry, the style of the authors is both concise and technical [...] this volume will appeal primarily to those devoting special attention to this field,"

== Reception ==
The reception of the book was mixed.

- William J. Firey in his review for zbMATH Open praised the book for its "beautiful and appropriate figures" but criticised "a certain imprecision about such fundamental notions as pattern, ornament, crystal."
- H.S.M. Coxeter in Mathematical Reviews also praised "this beautifully illustrated book", but took issue with the authors' artificially restricted approach to colour symmetry, describing it as "unfortunate" in comparison to that of A.V. Shubnikov and V.A. Koptsik in Symmetry in Science and Art, and C.H. MacGillavry's analysis of M.C. Escher's work in Symmetry aspects of M. C. Escher's periodic drawings.
- H. Martyn Cundy in The Mathematical Gazette wrote positively about the book: "It assumes little beyond the most elementary knowledge, develops the mathematics it needs as it goes along [...] and conveys the reader on a fascinating journey from the human face to polychromatic symmetry groups in three dimensions." and concluded by saying "Altogether this is a wholly delightful volume, obviously destined to be a classic work of reference which every school and college library will need and want to have, and to be treasured as a thing of beauty and a possession for ever by all lovers of geometry." However, Cundy also had some criticisms of the selection of material, and of the use of some non-standard terminology.
- In 1987, Branko Grünbaum and Geoffrey Colin Shephard writing in Tilings and patterns criticised the authors and their Russian predecessor N.V. Belov by saying that it is "clear that the groups of colour symmetries of chromatic plane patterns were not in the authors' minds."

== Editions ==
- First hardback edition published by Cambridge University Press in 1978
- Reprint edition published by Cambridge University Press in 2008

== Appendix: Subject coverage ==
Geometric symmetry subject coverage

Subject coverage
| # | Chapter | Topics |
|---|---|---|
| 1 | Reflexions and rotations | Reflection, rotation, central inversion |
| 2 | Finite patterns in the plane | Cyclic symmetry, dihedral symmetry |
| 3 | Frieze patterns | Motif, frieze pattern, frieze group, glide reflection, translation |
| 4 | Wallpaper patterns | Wallpaper pattern, net |
| 5 | Finite objects in three dimensions | Rotary inversion, polyhedra, crystallographic point symmetry |
| 6 | Rod patterns | Rod pattern, helix, screw motion, enantiomorphic |
| 7 | Layer patterns | Layer pattern |
| 8 | Space patterns | Lattice, triclinic, monoclinic, orthorhombic, tetragonal, hexagonal, rhombohedral, cubic, Bravais lattice |
| 9 | Patterns allowing continuous movement | Continuous movement, continuous symmetry of a circle, continuous symmetry of a sphere |
| 10 | Dilation symmetry | Dilation symmetry, On Growth and Form |
| 11 | Colour symmetry | Dichromatic symmetry, polychromatic symmetry, M. C. Escher |
| 12 | Classify and identifying plane patterns | Cell, pattern analysis |
| 13 | Making patterns | Tessellation, regular and semi-regular tessellations, Schläfli symbol |
| 14 | Movements in the plane | Isometry, symmetry movement, symmetry element, direct and opposite isometries, transform of a movement |
| 15 | Symmetry groups. Point groups | Point group, point groups in two dimensions, point groups in three dimensions, crystallographic restriction theorem, Abelian group |
| 16 | Line groups in two dimensions | Line group, translational symmetry |
| 17 | Nets | Net |
| 18 | Plane groups in two dimensions | Plane group |
| 19 | Movements in three dimensions | Rotation in three dimensions, screw rotation |
| 20 | Point groups in three dimensions | Point groups in three dimensions |
| 21 | Line groups in three dimensions | Line groups in three dimensions |
| 22 | Plane groups in three dimensions | Layer group |
| 23 | Lattices | Lattice, Bravais lattice |
| 24 | Space groups I | Diad and tetrad rotations |
| 25 | Space groups II | Triad and hexad rotations, list of space groups |
| 26 | Limiting groups | Limiting groups |
| 27 | Colour symmetry | Dichromatic symmetry, polychromatic symmetry, antisymmetry |
