= Generalized dihedral group =

Family of groups in mathematics

In mathematics, the generalized dihedral groups are a family of groups with algebraic structures similar to that of the dihedral groups. They include the finite dihedral groups, the infinite dihedral group, and the orthogonal group O(2). Dihedral groups play an important role in group theory, geometry, and chemistry.

== Definition ==
For any abelian group H, the generalized dihedral group of H, written Dih(H), is the semidirect product of H and Z_{2}, with Z_{2} acting on H by inverting elements. I.e., $\mathrm{Dih}(H) = H \rtimes_\phi Z_2$ with φ(0) the identity and φ(1) inversion.

Thus we get:

(h_{1}, 0) * (h_{2}, t_{2}) = (h_{1} + h_{2}, t_{2})
(h_{1}, 1) * (h_{2}, t_{2}) = (h_{1} − h_{2}, 1 + t_{2})

for all h_{1}, h_{2} in H and t_{2} in Z_{2}.

(Writing Z_{2} multiplicatively, we have (h_{1}, t_{1}) * (h_{2}, t_{2}) = (h_{1} + t_{1}h_{2}, t_{1}t_{2}) .)

Note that (h, 0) * (0,1) = (h,1), i.e. first the inversion and then the operation in H. Also (0, 1) * (h, t) = (−h, 1 + t); indeed (0,1) inverts h, and toggles t between "normal" (0) and "inverted" (1) (this combined operation is its own inverse).

The subgroup of Dih(H) of elements (h, 0) is a normal subgroup of index 2, isomorphic to H, while the elements (h, 1) are all their own inverse.

The conjugacy classes are:

- the sets {(h,0 ), (−h,0 )}
- the sets {(h + k + k, 1) | k in H }

Thus for every subgroup M of H, the corresponding set of elements (m,0) is also a normal subgroup. We have:

Dih(H) / M = Dih ( H / M )

== Examples ==
- Dih_{n} = Dih(Z_{n}) (the dihedral groups)
  - For even n there are two sets {(h + k + k, 1) | k in H }, and each generates a normal subgroup of type Dih_{n / 2}. As subgroups of the isometry group of the set of vertices of a regular n-gon they are different: the reflections in one subgroup all have two fixed points, while none in the other subgroup has (the rotations of both are the same). However, they are isomorphic as abstract groups.
  - For odd n there is only one set {(h + k + k, 1) | k in H }
- Dih_{∞} = Dih(Z) (the infinite dihedral group); there are two sets {(h + k + k, 1) | k in H }, and each generates a normal subgroup of type Dih_{∞}. As subgroups of the isometry group of Z they are different: the reflections in one subgroup all have a fixed point, the mirrors are at the integers, while none in the other subgroup has, the mirrors are in between (the translations of both are the same: by even numbers). However, they are isomorphic as abstract groups.
- Dih(S^{1}), or orthogonal group O(2,R), or O(2): the isometry group of a circle, or equivalently, the group of isometries in 2D that keep the origin fixed. The rotations form the circle group S^{1}, or equivalently SO(2,R), also written SO(2), and R/Z; it is also the multiplicative group of complex numbers of absolute value 1. In the latter case one of the reflections (generating the others) is complex conjugation. There are no proper normal subgroups with reflections. The discrete normal subgroups are cyclic groups of order n for all positive integers n. The quotient groups are isomorphic with the same group Dih(S^{1}).
- Dih(R^{n} ): the group of isometries of R^{n} consisting of all translations and inversion in all points; for n = 1 this is the Euclidean group E(1); for n > 1 the group Dih(R^{n} ) is a proper subgroup of E(n ), i.e. it does not contain all isometries.
- H can be any subgroup of R^{n}, e.g. a discrete subgroup; in that case, if it extends in n directions it is a lattice.
  - Discrete subgroups of Dih(R^{2} ) which contain translations in one direction are of frieze group type $\infty\infty$ and 22$\infty$.
  - Discrete subgroups of Dih(R^{2} ) which contain translations in two directions are of wallpaper group type p1 and p2.
  - Discrete subgroups of Dih(R^{3} ) which contain translations in three directions are space groups of the triclinic crystal system.

== Properties ==
Dih(H) is Abelian, with the semidirect product a direct product, if and only if all elements of H are their own inverse, i.e., an elementary abelian 2-group:

- Dih(Z_{1}) = Dih_{1} = Z_{2}
- Dih(Z_{2}) = Dih_{2} = Z_{2} × Z_{2} (Klein four-group)
- Dih(Dih_{2}) = Dih_{2} × Z_{2} = Z_{2} × Z_{2} × Z_{2}

etc.

== Topology ==
Dih(R^{n} ) and its dihedral subgroups are disconnected topological groups. Dih(R^{n} ) consists of two connected components: the identity component isomorphic to R^{n}, and the component with the reflections. Similarly O(2) consists of two connected components: the identity component isomorphic to the circle group, and the component with the reflections.

For the group Dih_{∞} we can distinguish two cases:

- Dih_{∞} as the isometry group of Z
- Dih_{∞} as a 2-dimensional isometry group generated by a rotation by an irrational number of turns, and a reflection

Both topological groups are totally disconnected, but in the first case the (singleton) components are open, while in the second case they are not. Also, the first topological group is a closed subgroup of Dih(R) but the second is not a closed subgroup of O(2).
