= Point groups in two dimensions =

Geometry concept

The Bauhinia blakeana flower on the Hong Kong flag has C_{5} symmetry; the star on each petal has D_{5} symmetry.

In geometry, a two-dimensional point group or rosette group is a group of geometric symmetries (isometries) that keep at least one point fixed in a plane. Every such group is a subgroup of the orthogonal group O(2), including O(2) itself. Its elements are rotations and reflections, and every such group containing only rotations is a subgroup of the special orthogonal group SO(2), including SO(2) itself. That group is isomorphic to R/Z and the first unitary group, U(1), a group also known as the circle group.

The two-dimensional point groups are important as a basis for the axial three-dimensional point groups, with the addition of reflections in the axial coordinate. They are also important in symmetries of organisms, like starfish and jellyfish, and organism parts, like flowers.

== Discrete groups ==
There are two families of discrete two-dimensional point groups, and they are specified with parameter n, which is the order of the group of the rotations in the group.

Group	Intl	Orbifold	Coxeter	Order	Description
C_{n}	n	n•	[n]^{+}	n	Cyclic: n-fold rotations. Abstract group Z_{n}, the group of integers under addition modulo n.
D_{n}	nm	*n•	[n]	2n	Dihedral: n-fold rotations and n-fold reflections. Abstract group Dih_{n}, the dihedral group.

Intl refers to Hermann–Mauguin notation or international notation, often used in crystallography. In the infinite limit, these groups become the one-dimensional line groups.

If a group is a symmetry of a two-dimensional lattice or grid, then the crystallographic restriction theorem restricts the value of n to 1, 2, 3, 4, and 6 for both families. There are thus 10 two-dimensional crystallographic point groups:

- C_{1}, C_{2}, C_{3}, C_{4}, C_{6},
- D_{1}, D_{2}, D_{3}, D_{4}, D_{6}

The groups may be constructed as follows:

- C_{n}. Generated by an element also called C_{n}, which corresponds to a rotation by angle 2π/n. Its elements are E (the identity), C_{n}, C_{n}^{2}, ..., C_{n}^{n−1}, corresponding to rotation angles 0, 2π/n, 4π/n, ..., 2(n − 1)π/n.
- D_{n}. Generated by element C_{n} and reflection σ. Its elements are the elements of group C_{n}, with elements σ, C_{n}σ, C_{n}^{2}σ, ..., C_{n}^{n−1}σ added. These additional ones correspond to reflections across lines with orientation angles 0, π/n, 2π/n, ..., (n − 1)π/n. D_{n} is thus a semidirect product of C_{n} and the group (E,σ).

All of these groups have distinct abstract groups, except for C_{2} and D_{1}, which share abstract group Z_{2}. All of the cyclic groups are abelian or commutative, but only two of the dihedral groups are: D_{1} ~ Z_{2} and D_{2} ~ Z_{2}×Z_{2}. In fact, D_{3} is the smallest nonabelian group.

For even n, the Hermann–Mauguin symbol nm is an abbreviation for the full symbol nmm, as explained below. The n in the H-M symbol denotes n-fold rotations, while the m denotes reflection or mirror planes.

Parity of n	Full Intl	Reflection lines for regular polygon
Even n	nmm	vertex to vertex, edge center to edge center (2 families, 2 m's)
Odd n	nm	vertex to edge center (1 family, 1 m)

== More general groups ==
These groups are readily constructed with two-dimensional orthogonal matrices.

The continuous cyclic group SO(2) or C_{∞} and its subgroups have elements that are rotation matrices:

$$R(\theta) =
\begin{bmatrix}
\cos \theta & -\sin \theta \\
\sin \theta & \cos \theta \\
\end{bmatrix}$$

where SO(2) has any possible θ. Not surprisingly, SO(2) and its subgroups are all abelian; addition of rotation angles commutes.

For discrete cyclic groups C_{n}, elements C_{n}^{k} = R(2πk/n)

The continuous dihedral group O(2) or D_{∞} and its subgroups with reflections have elements that include not only rotation matrices, but also reflection matrices:

$$S(\theta) =
\begin{bmatrix}
\cos \theta & \sin \theta \\
\sin \theta & -\cos \theta \\
\end{bmatrix}$$

where O(2) has any possible θ. However, the only abelian subgroups of O(2) with reflections are D_{1} and D_{2}.

For discrete dihedral groups D_{n}, elements C_{n}^{k}σ = S(2πk/n)

When one uses polar coordinates, the relationship of these groups to one-dimensional symmetry groups becomes evident.

Types of subgroups of SO(2):

- finite cyclic subgroups C_{n} (n ≥ 1); for every n there is one isometry group, of abstract group type Z_{n}
- finitely generated groups, each isomorphic to one of the form Z^{m} $\oplus$Z_{n} generated by C_{n} and m independent rotations with an irrational number of turns, and m, n ≥ 1; for each pair (m, n) there are uncountably many isometry groups, all the same as abstract group; for the pair (1, 1) the group is cyclic.
- other countable subgroups. For example, for an integer n, the group generated by all rotations of a number of turns equal to a negative integer power of n
- uncountable subgroups, including SO(2) itself

For every subgroup of SO(2) there is a corresponding uncountable class of subgroups of O(2) that are mutually isomorphic as abstract group: each of the subgroups in one class is generated by the first-mentioned subgroup and a single reflection in a line through the origin. These are the (generalized) dihedral groups, including the finite ones D_{n} (n ≥ 1) of abstract group type Dih_{n}. For n = 1 the common notation is C_{s}, of abstract group type Z_{2}.

As topological subgroups of O(2), only the finite isometry groups and SO(2) and O(2) are closed.

These groups fall into two distinct families, according to whether they consist of rotations only, or include reflections. The cyclic groups, C_{n} (abstract group type Z_{n}), consist of rotations by 360°/n, and all integer multiples. For example, a four-legged stool has symmetry group C_{4}, consisting of rotations by 0°, 90°, 180°, and 270°. The symmetry group of a square belongs to the family of dihedral groups, D_{n} (abstract group type Dih_{n}), including as many reflections as rotations. The infinite rotational symmetry of the circle implies reflection symmetry as well, but formally the circle group S_{1} is distinct from Dih(S_{1}) because the latter explicitly includes the reflections.

An infinite group need not be continuous; for example, we have a group of all integer multiples of rotation by 360°/√2, which does not include rotation by 180°. Depending on its application, homogeneity up to an arbitrarily fine level of detail in a transverse direction may be considered equivalent to full homogeneity in that direction, in which case these symmetry groups can be ignored.

C_{n} and D_{n} for n = 1, 2, 3, 4, and 6 can be combined with translational symmetry, sometimes in more than one way. Thus these 10 groups give rise to 17 wallpaper groups.

== Symmetry groups ==
The 2D symmetry groups correspond to the isometry groups, except that symmetry according to O(2) and SO(2) can only be distinguished in the generalized symmetry concept applicable for vector fields.

Also, depending on application, homogeneity up to arbitrarily fine detail in transverse direction may be considered equivalent to full homogeneity in that direction. This greatly simplifies the categorization: we can restrict ourselves to the closed topological subgroups of O(2): the finite ones and O(2) (circular symmetry), and for vector fields SO(2).

These groups also correspond to the one-dimensional symmetry groups, when wrapped around in a circle.

== Combinations with translational symmetry ==
E(2) is a semidirect product of O(2) and the translation group T. In other words, O(2) is a subgroup of E(2) isomorphic to the quotient group of E(2) by T:

O(2) $\cong$ E(2) / T

There is a "natural" surjective group homomorphism p : E(2) → E(2)/ T, sending each element g of E(2) to the coset of T to which g belongs, that is: p (g) = gT, sometimes called the canonical projection of E(2) onto E(2) / T or O(2). Its kernel is T.

For every subgroup of E(2) we can consider its image under p: a point group consisting of the cosets to which the elements of the subgroup belong, in other words, the point group obtained by ignoring translational parts of isometries. For every discrete subgroup of E(2), due to the crystallographic restriction theorem, this point group is either C_{n} or of type D_{n} for n = 1, 2, 3, 4, or 6.

C_{n} and D_{n} for n = 1, 2, 3, 4, and 6 can be combined with translational symmetry, sometimes in more than one way. Thus these 10 groups give rise to 17 wallpaper groups, and the four groups with n = 1 and 2, give also rise to 7 frieze groups.

For each of the wallpaper groups p1, p2, p3, p4, p6, the image under p of all isometry groups (i.e. the "projections" onto E(2) / T or O(2) ) are all equal to the corresponding C_{n}; also two frieze groups correspond to C_{1} and C_{2}.

The isometry groups of p6m are each mapped to one of the point groups of type D_{6}. For the other 11 wallpaper groups, each isometry group is mapped to one of the point groups of the types D_{1}, D_{2}, D_{3}, or D_{4}. Also five frieze groups correspond to D_{1} and D_{2}.

For a given hexagonal translation lattice there are two different groups D_{3}, giving rise to P31m and p3m1. For each of the types D_{1}, D_{2}, and D_{4} the distinction between the 3, 4, and 2 wallpaper groups, respectively, is determined by the translation vector associated with each reflection in the group: since isometries are in the same coset regardless of translational components, a reflection and a glide reflection with the same mirror are in the same coset. Thus, isometry groups of e.g. type p4m and p4g are both mapped to point groups of type D_{4}.

For a given isometry group, the conjugates of a translation in the group by the elements of the group generate a translation group (a lattice)—that is a subgroup of the isometry group that only depends on the translation we started with, and the point group associated with the isometry group. This is because the conjugate of the translation by a glide reflection is the same as by the corresponding reflection: the translation vector is reflected.

If the isometry group contains an n-fold rotation then the lattice has n-fold symmetry for even n and 2n-fold for odd n. If, in the case of a discrete isometry group containing a translation, we apply this for a translation of minimum length, then, considering the vector difference of translations in two adjacent directions, it follows that n ≤ 6, and for odd n that 2n ≤ 6, hence n = 1, 2, 3, 4, or 6 (the crystallographic restriction theorem).

== See also ==
- Point group
- Point groups in three dimensions
- Point groups in four dimensions
- One-dimensional symmetry group
