= One-dimensional symmetry group =

Symmetry group in 1D systems

A one-dimensional symmetry group is a mathematical group that describes symmetries in one dimension (1D).

A pattern in 1D can be represented as a function f(x) for, say, the color at position x.

The only nontrivial point group in 1D is a simple reflection. It can be represented by the simplest Coxeter group, A_{1}, [ ], or Coxeter-Dynkin diagram.

Affine symmetry groups represent translation. Isometries which leave the function unchanged are translations x + a with a such that f(x + a) = f(x) and reflections a − x with a such that f(a − x) = f(x). The reflections can be represented by the affine Coxeter group [∞], or Coxeter-Dynkin diagram representing two reflections, and the translational symmetry as [∞]^{+}, or Coxeter-Dynkin diagram as the composite of two reflections.

== Point group ==
For a pattern without translational symmetry there are the following possibilities (1D point groups):

- the symmetry group is the trivial group (no symmetry)
- the symmetry group is one of the groups each consisting of the identity and reflection in a point (isomorphic to Z_{2})

Group	Coxeter	Description
C_{1}	[ ]^{+}	Identity, Trivial group Z_{1}
D_{1}	[ ]	Reflection. Abstract groups Z_{2} or Dih_{1}.

== Discrete symmetry groups ==
These affine symmetries can be considered limiting cases of the 2D dihedral and cyclic groups:

Group	Coxeter	Description
C_{∞}	[∞]^{+}	Cyclic: ∞-fold rotations become translations. Abstract group Z_{∞}, the infinite cyclic group.
D_{∞}	[∞]	Dihedral: ∞-fold reflections. Abstract group Dih_{∞}, the infinite dihedral group.

=== Translational symmetry ===
Consider all patterns in 1D which have translational symmetry, i.e., functions f(x) such that for some a > 0, f(x + a) = f(x) for all x. For these patterns, the values of a for which this property holds form a group.

We first consider patterns for which the group is discrete, i.e., for which the positive values in the group have a minimum. By rescaling we make this minimum value 1.

Such patterns fall in two categories, the two 1D space groups or line groups.

In the simpler case the only isometries of R which map the pattern to itself are translations; this applies, e.g., for the pattern

− −−−  − −−−  − −−−  − −−−

Each isometry can be characterized by an integer, namely plus or minus the translation distance. Therefore the symmetry group is Z.

In the other case, among the isometries of R which map the pattern to itself there are also reflections; this applies, e.g., for the pattern

− −−− −  − −−− −  − −−− −

We choose the origin for x at one of the points of reflection. Now all reflections which map the pattern to itself are of the form a−x where the constant "a" is an integer (the increments of a are 1 again, because we can combine a reflection and a translation to get another reflection, and we can combine two reflections to get a translation). Therefore all isometries can be characterized by an integer and a code, say 0 or 1, for translation or reflection.

Thus:

- $(a,0):x \mapsto x + a$
- $(a,1):x\mapsto a - x$

The latter is a reflection with respect to the point a/2 (an integer or an integer plus 1/2).

Group operations (function composition, the one on the right first) are, for integers a and b:

- $(a,0) \circ (b,0)=(a + b,0)$
- $(a,0) \circ (b,1)=(a + b,1)$
- $(a,1) \circ (b,0)=(a - b,1)$
- $(a,1) \circ (b,1)=(a - b,0)$

E.g., in the third case: translation by an amount b changes x into x + b, reflection with respect to 0 gives−x − b, and a translation a gives a − b − x.

This group is called the generalized dihedral group of Z, Dih(Z), and also D_{∞}. It is a semidirect product of Z and C_{2}. It has a normal subgroup of index 2 isomorphic to Z: the translations. Also it contains an element f of order 2 such that, for all n in Z, n f = f n^{−1}: the reflection with respect to the reference point, (0,1).

The two groups are called lattice groups. The lattice is Z. As translation cell we can take the interval 0 ≤ x < 1. In the first case the fundamental domain can be taken the same; topologically it is a circle (1-torus); in the second case we can take 0 ≤ x ≤ 0.5.

The actual discrete symmetry group of a translationally symmetric pattern can be:

- of group 1 type, for any positive value of the smallest translation distance
- of group 2 type, for any positive value of the smallest translation distance, and any positioning of the lattice of points of reflection (which is twice as dense as the translation lattice)

The set of translationally symmetric patterns can thus be classified by actual symmetry group, while actual symmetry groups, in turn, can be classified as type 1 or type 2.

These space group types are the symmetry groups “up to conjugacy with respect to affine transformations”: the affine transformation changes the translation distance to the standard one (above: 1), and the position of one of the points of reflections, if applicable, to the origin. Thus the actual symmetry group contains elements of the form gag^{−1}= b, which is a conjugate of a.

=== Non-discrete symmetry groups ===
For a homogeneous “pattern” the symmetry group contains all translations, and reflection in all points. The symmetry group is isomorphic to Dih(R).

There are also less trivial patterns/functions with translational symmetry for arbitrarily small translations, e.g. the group of translations by rational distances. Even apart from scaling and shifting, there are infinitely many cases, e.g. by considering rational numbers of which the denominators are powers of a given prime number.

The translations form a group of isometries. However, there is no pattern with this group as symmetry group.

== 1D-symmetry of a function vs. 2D-symmetry of its graph ==
Symmetries of a function (in the sense of this article) imply corresponding symmetries of its graph. However, 2-fold rotational symmetry of the graph does not imply any symmetry (in the sense of this article) of the function: function values (in a pattern representing colors, grey shades, etc.) are nominal data, i.e. grey is not between black and white, the three colors are simply all different.

Even with nominal colors there can be a special kind of symmetry, as in:

−−−−−−− -- − −−−   − −  −

(reflection gives the negative image). This is also not included in the classification.

== Group action ==
Group actions of the symmetry group that can be considered in this connection are:

- on R
- on the set of real functions of a real variable (each representing a pattern)

This section illustrates group action concepts for these cases.

The action of G on X is called

- transitive if for any two x, y in X there exists a g in G such that g · x = y; for neither of the two group actions this is the case for any discrete symmetry group
- faithful (or effective) if for any two different g, h in G there exists an x in X such that g · x ≠ h · x; for both group actions this is the case for any discrete symmetry group (because, except for the identity, symmetry groups do not contain elements that “do nothing”)
- free if for any two different g, h in G and all x in X we have g · x ≠ h · x; this is the case if there are no reflections
- regular (or simply transitive) if it is both transitive and free; this is equivalent to saying that for any two x, y in X there exists precisely one g in G such that g · x = y.

== Orbits and stabilizers ==
Consider a group G acting on a set X. The orbit of a point x in X is the set of elements of X to which x can be moved by the elements of G. The orbit of x is denoted by Gx:

$$Gx = \left\{ g\cdot x \mid g \in G \right\}.$$

Case that the group action is on R:

- For the trivial group, all orbits contain only one element; for a group of translations, an orbit is e.g. {..,−9,1,11,21,..}, for a reflection e.g. {2,4}, and for the symmetry group with translations and reflections, e.g., {−8,−6,2,4,12,14,22,24,..} (translation distance is 10, points of reflection are ..,−7,−2,3,8,13,18,23,..). The points within an orbit are “equivalent”. If a symmetry group applies for a pattern, then within each orbit the color is the same.

Case that the group action is on patterns:

- The orbits are sets of patterns, containing translated and/or reflected versions, “equivalent patterns”. A translation of a pattern is only equivalent if the translation distance is one of those included in the symmetry group considered, and similarly for a mirror image.

The set of all orbits of X under the action of G is written as X/G.

If Y is a subset of X, we write GY for the set {g · y : y $\in$ Y and g $\in$ G}. We call the subset Y invariant under G if GY = Y (which is equivalent to GY ⊆ Y). In that case, G also operates on Y. The subset Y is called fixed under G if g · y = yfor all g in G and all y in Y. In the example of the orbit {−8,−6,2,4,12,14,22,24,..}, {−9,−8,−6,−5,1,2,4,5,11,12,14,15,21,22,24,25,..} is invariant under G, but not fixed.

For every x in X, we define the stabilizer subgroup of x (also called the isotropy group or little group) as the set of all elements in G that fix x:

$$G_x = \{g \in G \mid g\cdot x = x\}.$$

If x is a reflection point, its stabilizer is the group of order two containing the identity and the reflection inx. In other cases the stabilizer is the trivial group.

For a fixed x in X, consider the map from G to X given by $g \mid \rightarrow g \cdot x$. The image of this map is the orbit of x and the coimage is the set of all left cosets of G_{x}. The standard quotient theorem of set theory then gives a natural bijection between $G / G_x$ and $Gx$. Specifically, the bijection is given by $hG_x \mid \rightarrow h \cdot x$. This result is known as the orbit-stabilizer theorem. If, in the example, we take $x = 3$, the orbit is {−7,3,13,23,..}, and the two groups are isomorphic with Z.

If two elements $x$ and $y$ belong to the same orbit, then their stabilizer subgroups, $G_x$ and $G_y$, are isomorphic. More precisely: if $y = g \cdot x$, then $G_y = gG_x g^{-1}$. In the example this applies e.g. for 3 and 23, both reflection points. Reflection about 23 corresponds to a translation of −20, reflection about 3, and translation of 20.

== See also ==
- Line group
- Frieze group
- Space group
- Wallpaper group
