= Space group =

Symmetry group of a configuration in space

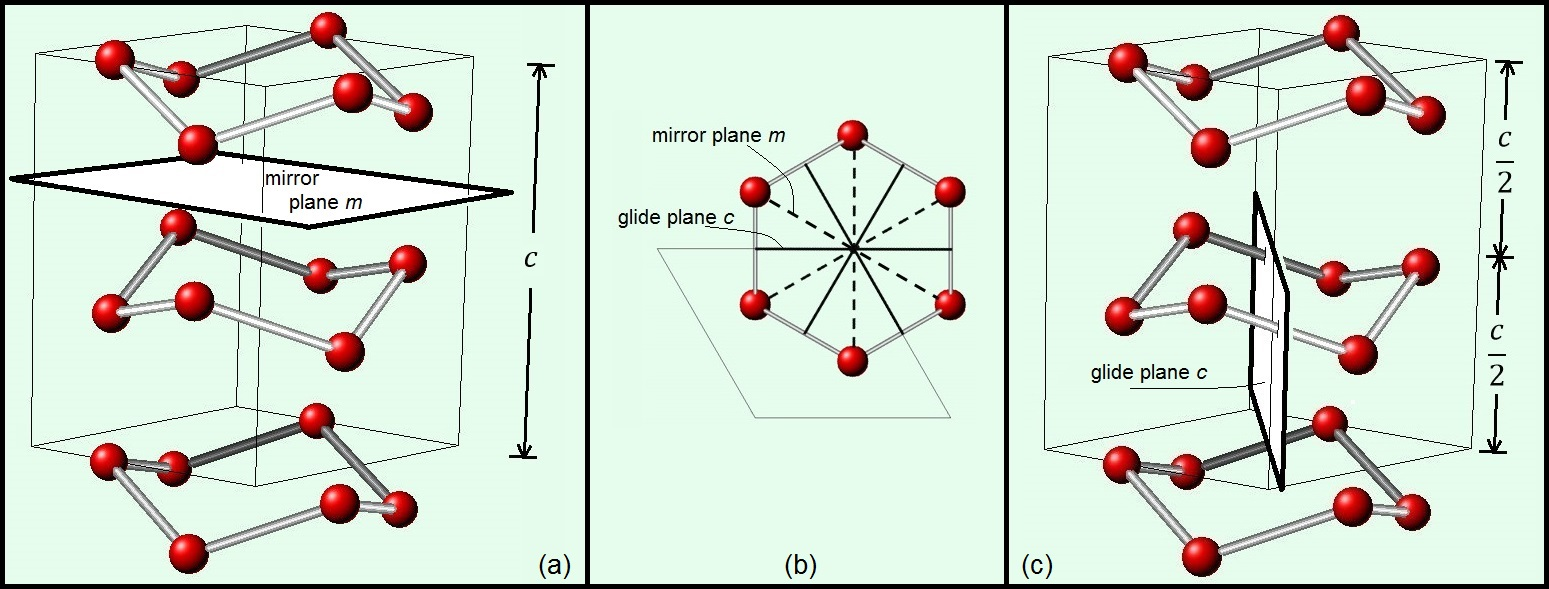
The space group of hexagonal H_{2}O ice is P6_{3}/mmc. The first m indicates the mirror plane perpendicular to the c-axis (a), the second m indicates the mirror planes parallel to the c-axis (b), and the c indicates the glide planes (b) and (c). The black boxes outline the unit cell.

In mathematics, physics and chemistry, a space group is the symmetry group of a repeating pattern in space, usually in three dimensions. The elements of a space group (its symmetry operations) are the rigid transformations of the pattern that leave it unchanged. Usually the term is applied to groups that repeat in all three dimensions, but the line groups and the wallpaper groups also apply, or can apply, to three-dimensional arrangements. The space groups that repeat in all three dimensions are classified into 219 distinct types, or 230 types if chiral copies are considered distinct. Space groups are discrete cocompact groups of isometries of an oriented Euclidean space in any number of dimensions. In dimensions other than 3, they are sometimes called Bieberbach groups.

In crystallography, space groups are also called the crystallographic or Fedorov groups, and represent a description of the symmetry of the crystal. Large collected sources of this information are available.

== History ==
Space groups in 2 dimensions are the 17 wallpaper groups which have been known for several centuries, though the proof that the list was complete was only given in 1891, after the much more difficult classification of space groups had largely been completed.

In 1879 the German mathematician Leonhard Sohncke listed the 65 space groups (called Sohncke groups) whose elements preserve the chirality. More accurately, he listed 66 groups, but both the Russian mathematician and crystallographer Evgraf Fedorov and the German mathematician Arthur Moritz Schoenflies noticed that two of them were really the same. The space groups in three dimensions were first enumerated in 1891 by Fedorov (whose list had two omissions (I4̅3d and Fdd2) and one duplication (Fmm2)), and shortly afterwards in 1891 were independently enumerated by Schönflies (whose list had four omissions (I4̅3d, Pc, Cc, ?) and one duplication (P4̅2_{1}m)). The correct list of 230 space groups was found by 1892 during correspondence between Fedorov and Schönflies. William Barlow later enumerated the groups with a different method, but omitted four groups (Fdd2, I4̅2d, P4̅2_{1}d, and P4̅2_{1}c). A detailed description of the history of the discovery of the space groups has been written.

== Elements ==
The space groups in three dimensions are made from combinations of the 32 crystallographic point groups with the 14 Bravais lattices, each of the latter belonging to one of 7 lattice systems. What this means is that the action of any element of a given space group can be expressed as the action of an element of the appropriate point group followed optionally by a translation. A space group is thus some combination of the translational symmetry of a unit cell (including lattice centering), the point group symmetry operations of reflection, rotation and improper rotation (also called rotoinversion), and the screw axis and glide plane symmetry operations. The combination of all these symmetry operations results in a total of 230 different space groups describing all possible crystal symmetries.

The number of replicates of the asymmetric unit in a unit cell is thus the number of lattice points in the cell times the order of the point group. This ranges from 1 in the case of space group P1 to 192 for a space group like Fm3̅m, the NaCl structure.

=== Elements fixing a point ===
The elements of the space group fixing a point of space are the identity element, reflections, rotations and improper rotations, including inversion points.

=== Translations ===
The translations form a normal abelian subgroup of rank 3, called the Bravais lattice (so named after French physicist Auguste Bravais). There are 14 possible types of Bravais lattice. The quotient of the space group by the Bravais lattice is a finite group which is one of the 32 possible point groups.

=== Glide planes ===
A glide plane is a reflection in a plane, followed by a translation parallel with that plane. This is noted by a, b, or c, depending on which axis the glide is along. There is also the n glide, which is a glide along the half of a diagonal of a face, and the d glide, which is a fourth of the way along either a face or space diagonal of the unit cell. The latter is called the diamond glide plane as it features in the diamond structure. In 17 space groups, due to the centering of the cell, the glides occur in two perpendicular directions simultaneously, i.e. the same glide plane can be called b or c, a or b, a or c. For example, group Abm2 could be also called Acm2, group Ccca could be called Cccb. In 1992, it was suggested to use symbol e for such planes. The symbols for five space groups have been modified:

Space group no.	39	41	64	67	68
New symbol	Aem2	Aea2	Cmce	Cmme	Ccce
Old Symbol	Abm2	Aba2	Cmca	Cmma	Ccca

=== Screw axes ===
A screw axis is a rotation about an axis, followed by a translation along the direction of the axis. These are noted by a number, n, to describe the degree of rotation, where the number is how many operations must be applied to complete a full rotation (e.g., 3 would mean a rotation one third of the way around the axis each time). The degree of translation is then added as a subscript showing how far along the axis the translation is, as a portion of the parallel lattice vector. So, 2_{1} is a twofold rotation followed by a translation of 1/2 of the lattice vector.

=== General formula ===
The general formula for the action of an element of a space group is

y = M.x + D

where M is its matrix, D is its vector, and where the element transforms point x into point y. In general, D = D (lattice) + D(M), where D(M) is a unique function of M that is zero for M being the identity. The matrices M form a point group that is a basis of the space group; the lattice must be symmetric under that point group, but the crystal structure itself may not be symmetric under that point group as applied to any particular point (that is, without a translation). For example, the diamond cubic structure does not have any point where the cubic point group applies.

The lattice dimension can be less than the overall dimension, resulting in a "subperiodic" space group. For (overall dimension, lattice dimension):

- (1,1): One-dimensional line groups
- (2,1): Two-dimensional line groups: frieze groups
- (2,2): Wallpaper groups
- (3,1): Three-dimensional line groups; with the 3D crystallographic point groups, the rod groups
- (3,2): Layer groups
- (3,3): The space groups discussed in this article

=== Chirality ===
The 65 "Sohncke" space groups, not containing any mirrors, inversion points, improper rotations or glide planes, yield chiral crystals, not identical to their mirror image; whereas space groups that do include at least one of those give achiral crystals. Achiral molecules sometimes form chiral crystals, but chiral molecules always form chiral crystals, in one of the space groups that permit this.

Among the 65 Sohncke groups are 22 that come in 11 enantiomorphic pairs.

=== Combinations ===
Only certain combinations of symmetry elements are possible in a space group. Translations are always present, and the space group P1 has only translations and the identity element. The presence of mirrors implies glide planes as well, and the presence of rotation axes implies screw axes as well, but the converses are not true. An inversion and a mirror implies two-fold screw axes, and so on.

== Notation ==
There are at least ten methods of naming space groups. Some of these methods can assign several different names to the same space group, so altogether there are many thousands of different names.

Number
The International Union of Crystallography publishes tables of all space group types, and assigns each a unique number from 1 to 230. The numbering is arbitrary, except that groups with the same crystal system or point group are given consecutive numbers.
International symbol notation
Hermann–Mauguin notation
The Hermann–Mauguin (or international) notation describes the lattice and some generators for the group. It has a shortened form called the international short symbol, which is the one most commonly used in crystallography, and usually consists of a set of four symbols. The first describes the centering of the Bravais lattice (P, A, C, I, R or F). The next three describe the most prominent symmetry operation visible when projected along one of the high symmetry directions of the crystal. These symbols are the same as used in point groups, with the addition of glide planes and screw axis, described above. By way of example, the space group of quartz is P3_{1}21, showing that it exhibits primitive centering of the motif (i.e., once per unit cell), with a threefold screw axis and a twofold rotation axis. Note that it does not explicitly contain the crystal system, although this is unique to each space group (in the case of P3_{1}21, it is trigonal).
In the international short symbol the first symbol (3_{1} in this example) denotes the symmetry along the major axis (c-axis in trigonal cases), the second (2 in this case) along axes of secondary importance (a and b) and the third symbol the symmetry in another direction. In the trigonal case there also exists a space group P3_{1}12. In this space group the twofold axes are not along the a and b-axes but in a direction rotated by 30°.
The international symbols and international short symbols for some of the space groups were changed slightly between 1935 and 2002, so several space groups have 4 different international symbols in use.

The viewing directions of the 7 crystal systems are shown as follows.

Symbol position	Triclinic	Monoclinic	Orthorhombic	Tetragonal	Trigonal	Hexagonal	Cubic
1	—	b	a	c	c	c	a
2	—		b	a	a	a	[111]
3	—		c	[110]	[210]	[210]	[110]

Hall notation
Space group notation with an explicit origin. Rotation, translation and axis-direction symbols are clearly separated and inversion centers are explicitly defined. The construction and format of the notation make it particularly suited to computer generation of symmetry information. For example, group number 3 has three Hall symbols: P 2y (P 1 2 1), P 2 (P 1 1 2), P 2x (P 2 1 1).
Schönflies notation
The space groups with given point group are numbered by 1, 2, 3, ... (in the same order as their international number) and this number is added as a superscript to the Schönflies symbol for the point group. For example, groups numbers 3 to 5 whose point group is C_{2} have Schönflies symbols C^{1}_{2}, C^{2}_{2}, C^{3}_{2}.
Fedorov notation
Shubnikov symbol
Strukturbericht designation
A related notation for crystal structures given a letter and index:

Symbol	Meaning
A	Elements (monoatomic)
B	AB compounds.
C	AB_{2} compounds.
D	A_{m}B_{n} compounds.
E	More complex compounds.
F	More complex compounds.
...	More complex compounds.
K	More complex compounds.
L	Alloys
O	Organic compounds
S	Silicates

Some structure designation share the same space groups. For example, space group 225 is A_{1}, B_{1}, and C_{1}. Space group 221 is A_{h}, and B_{2}. However, crystallographers would not use Strukturbericht notation to describe the space group, rather it would be used to describe a specific crystal structure (e.g. space group + atomic arrangement (motif)).
Orbifold notation (2D)
Fibrifold notation (3D)
Describes the orbifold, given by the quotient of Euclidean space by the space group, rather than generators of the space group. It was introduced by Conway and Thurston, and is not used much outside mathematics. Some of the space groups have several different fibrifolds associated to them, so have several different fibrifold symbols.
Coxeter notation
Spatial and point symmetry groups, represented as modifications of the pure reflectional Coxeter groups.
Geometric notation
A geometric algebra notation.

== Classification systems ==
There are (at least) 10 different ways to classify space groups into classes. The relations between some of these are described in the following table. Each classification system is a refinement of the ones below it. To understand an explanation given here it may be necessary to understand the next one down.

(Crystallographic) space group types (230 in three dimensions)
Two space groups, considered as subgroups of the group of affine transformations of space, have the same space group type if they are the same up to an affine transformation of space that preserves orientation. Thus e.g. a change of angle between translation vectors does not affect the space group type if it does not add or remove any symmetry. A more formal definition involves conjugacy (see Symmetry group). In three dimensions, for 11 of the affine space groups, there is no chirality-preserving (i.e. orientation-preserving) map from the group to its mirror image, so if one distinguishes groups from their mirror images, these each split into two cases (such as P4_{1} and P4_{3}). So, instead of the 54 affine space groups that preserve chirality, there are 54 + 11 = 65 space group types that preserve chirality (the Sohncke groups). For most chiral crystals, the two enantiomorphs belong to the same crystallographic space group, such as P2_{1}3 for FeSi, but others, such as quartz belong to two enantiomorphic space groups.
Affine space group types (219 in three dimensions)
Two space groups, considered as subgroups of the group of affine transformations of space, have the same affine space group type if they are the same up to an affine transformation, even if that inverts orientation. The affine space group type is determined by the underlying abstract group of the space group. In three dimensions, Fifty-four of the affine space group types preserve chirality and give chiral crystals. The two enantiomorphs of a chiral crystal have the same affine space group.
Arithmetic crystal classes (73 in three dimensions)
Sometimes called Z-classes. These are determined by the point group together with the action of the point group on the subgroup of translations. In other words, the arithmetic crystal classes correspond to conjugacy classes of finite subgroup of the general linear group GL_{n}(Z) over the integers. A space group is called symmorphic (or split) if there is a point such that all symmetries are the product of a symmetry fixing this point and a translation. Equivalently, a space group is symmorphic if it is a semidirect product of its point group with its translation subgroup. There are 73 symmorphic space groups, with exactly one in each arithmetic crystal class. There are also 157 nonsymmorphic space group types with varying numbers in the arithmetic crystal classes. Arithmetic crystal classes may be interpreted as different orientations of the point groups in the lattice, with the group elements' matrix components being constrained to have integer coefficients in lattice space. This is rather easy to picture in the two-dimensional, wallpaper group case. Some of the point groups have reflections, and the reflection lines can be along the lattice directions, halfway in between them, or both.: None: C_{1}: p1; C_{2}: p2; C_{3}: p3; C_{4}: p4; C_{6}: p6; Along: D_{1}: pm, pg; D_{2}: pmm, pmg, pgg; D_{3}: p31m; Between: D_{1}: cm; D_{2}: cmm; D_{3}: p3m1; Both: D_{4}: p4m, p4g; D_{6}: p6m
(geometric) Crystal classes (32 in three dimensions)	Bravais flocks (14 in three dimensions)
Sometimes called Q-classes. The crystal class of a space group is determined by its point group: the quotient by the subgroup of translations, acting on the lattice. Two space groups are in the same crystal class if and only if their point groups, which are subgroups of GL_{n}(Z), are conjugate in the larger group GL_{n}(Q).	These are determined by the underlying Bravais lattice type. These correspond to conjugacy classes of lattice point groups in GL_{n}(Z), where the lattice point group is the group of symmetries of the underlying lattice that fix a point of the lattice, and contains the point group.
Crystal systems (7 in three dimensions)	Lattice systems (7 in three dimensions)
Crystal systems are an ad hoc modification of the lattice systems to make them compatible with the classification according to point groups. They differ from crystal families in that the hexagonal crystal family is split into two subsets, called the trigonal and hexagonal crystal systems. The trigonal crystal system is larger than the rhombohedral lattice system, the hexagonal crystal system is smaller than the hexagonal lattice system, and the remaining crystal systems and lattice systems are the same.	The lattice system of a space group is determined by the conjugacy class of the lattice point group (a subgroup of GL_{n}(Z)) in the larger group GL_{n}(Q). In three dimensions the lattice point group can have one of the 7 different orders 2, 4, 8, 12, 16, 24, or 48. The hexagonal crystal family is split into two subsets, called the rhombohedral and hexagonal lattice systems.
Crystal families (6 in three dimensions)
The point group of a space group does not quite determine its lattice system, because occasionally two space groups with the same point group may be in different lattice systems. Crystal families are formed from lattice systems by merging the two lattice systems whenever this happens, so that the crystal family of a space group is determined by either its lattice system or its point group. In 3 dimensions the only two lattice families that get merged in this way are the hexagonal and rhombohedral lattice systems, which are combined into the hexagonal crystal family. The 6 crystal families in 3 dimensions are called triclinic, monoclinic, orthorhombic, tetragonal, hexagonal, and cubic. Crystal families are commonly used in popular books on crystals, where they are sometimes called crystal systems.

Another classification of the space groups is called a fibrifold notation, according to the fibrifold structures on the corresponding orbifold. The 219 affine space groups are divided into reducible and irreducible groups. The reducible groups fall into 17 classes corresponding to the 17 wallpaper groups, and the remaining 35 irreducible groups are the same as the cubic groups and are classified separately.

== In other dimensions ==
=== Bieberbach's theorems ===
In n dimensions, an affine space group, or Bieberbach group, is a discrete subgroup of isometries of n-dimensional Euclidean space with a compact fundamental domain. Biberbach proved that the subgroup of translations of any such group contains n linearly independent translations, and is a free abelian subgroup of finite index, and is also the unique maximal normal abelian subgroup. He also showed that in any dimension n there are only a finite number of possibilities for the isomorphism class of the underlying group of a space group, and moreover the action of the group on Euclidean space is unique up to conjugation by affine transformations. This answers part of Hilbert's eighteenth problem. It was shown that conversely any group that is the extension of Z^{n} by a finite group acting faithfully is an affine space group. Combining these results shows that classifying space groups in n dimensions up to conjugation by affine transformations is essentially the same as classifying isomorphism classes for groups that are extensions of Z^{n} by a finite group acting faithfully.

It is essential in Bieberbach's theorems to assume that the group acts as isometries; the theorems do not generalize to discrete cocompact groups of affine transformations of Euclidean space. A counter-example is given by the 3-dimensional Heisenberg group of the integers acting by translations on the Heisenberg group of the reals, identified with 3-dimensional Euclidean space. This is a discrete cocompact group of affine transformations of space, but does not contain a subgroup Z^{3}.

=== Classification in small dimensions ===
This table gives the number of space group types in small dimensions, including the numbers of various classes of space group. The numbers of enantiomorphic pairs are given in parentheses.

Dimensions	Crystal families, OEIS sequence A004032	Crystal systems, OEIS sequence A004031	Bravais lattices, OEIS sequence A256413	Abstract crystallographic point groups, OEIS sequence A006226	Geometric crystal classes, Q-classes, crystallographic point groups, OEIS sequence A004028	Arithmetic crystal classes, Z-classes, OEIS sequence A004027	Affine space group types, OEIS sequence A004029	Crystallographic space group types, OEIS sequence A006227
0 (Note: Trivial group)	1	1	1	1	1	1	1	1
1 (Note: One is the group of integers and the other is the infinite dihedral group; see symmetry groups in one dimension.)	1	1	1	2	2	2	2	2
2 (Note: These 2D space groups are also called wallpaper groups or plane groups.)	4	4	5	9	10	13	17	17
3 (Note: In 3D, there are 230 crystallographic space group types, which reduces to 219 affine space group types because of some types being different from their mirror image; these are said to differ by enantiomorphous character (e.g. P3_{1}12 and P3_{2}12). Usually space group refers to 3D. They were enumerated independently by multiple researchers.)	6	7	14	18	32	73	219 (+11)	230
4 (Note: The 4894 4-dimensional groups have been enumerated (and corrected) over time; originally 4895 were listed due to one too many enantiomorphic groups being present.)	23 (+6)	33 (+7)	64 (+10)	118	227 (+44)	710 (+70)	4783 (+111)	4894
5 (Note: Dimension 5 was enumerated first. Later the enantiomorphs were counted.)	32	59	189	239	955	6079	222018 (+79)	222097
6 (Note: Enumeration of dimension 6 was completed first; later the corrected figures were found. The initially published number of 826 Lattice types in was corrected to 841.)	91	251	841	1594	7103	85308 (+?)	28927915 (+?)	?

=== Magnetic groups and time reversal ===
In addition to crystallographic space groups there are also magnetic space groups (also called two-color (black and white) crystallographic groups or Shubnikov groups). These symmetries contain an element known as time reversal. They treat time as an additional dimension, and the group elements can include time reversal as reflection in it. They are of importance in magnetic structures that contain ordered unpaired spins, i.e. ferro-, ferri- or antiferromagnetic structures as studied by neutron diffraction. The time reversal element flips a magnetic spin while leaving all other structure the same and it can be combined with a number of other symmetry elements. Including time reversal there are 1651 magnetic space groups in 3D. It has also been possible to construct magnetic versions for other overall and lattice dimensions. Frieze groups are magnetic 1D line groups and layer groups are magnetic wallpaper groups, and the axial 3D point groups are magnetic 2D point groups. Number of original and magnetic groups by (overall, lattice) dimension:

Overall dimension	Lattice dimension	Ordinary groups			Magnetic groups	
Overall dimension	Lattice dimension	Name	Symbol	Count	Symbol	Count
0	0	Zero-dimensional symmetry group	G_{0}	1	G^{1}_{0}	2
1	0	One-dimensional point groups	G_{10}	2	G^{1}_{10}	5
1	1	One-dimensional discrete symmetry groups	G_{1}	2	G^{1}_{1}	7
2	0	Two-dimensional point groups	G_{20}	10	G^{1}_{20}	31
2	1	Frieze groups	G_{21}	7	G^{1}_{21}	31
2	2	Wallpaper groups	G_{2}	17	G^{1}_{2}	80
3	0	Three-dimensional point groups	G_{30}	32	G^{1}_{30}	122
3	1	Rod groups	G_{31}	75	G^{1}_{31}	394
3	2	Layer groups	G_{32}	80	G^{1}_{32}	528
3	3	Three-dimensional space groups	G_{3}	230	G^{1}_{3}	1651
4	0	Four-dimensional point groups	G_{40}	271	G^{1}_{40}	1202
4	1		G_{41}	343		
4	2		G_{42}	1091		
4	3		G_{43}	1594		
4	4	Four-dimensional discrete symmetry groups	G_{4}	4894	G^{1}_{4}	62227

== Table of space groups in 2 dimensions (wallpaper groups) ==
Table of the wallpaper groups using the classification of the 2-dimensional space groups:

Crystal system, Bravais lattice	Geometric class, point group					Arithmetic; class	Wallpaper groups (cell diagram)	
Crystal system, Bravais lattice	Int'l	Schön.	Orbifold	Cox.	Ord.	Arithmetic; class	Wallpaper groups (cell diagram)	
Oblique	1	C_{1}	(1)	[ ]^{+}	1	None	p1 (1)	
Oblique	2	C_{2}	(22)	[2]^{+}	2	None	p2 (2222)	
Rectangular	m	D_{1}	(*)	[ ]	2	Along	pm (**)	pg (××)
Rectangular	2mm	D_{2}	(*22)	[2]	4	Along	pmm (*2222)	pmg (22*)
Centered rectangular	m	D_{1}	(*)	[ ]	2	Between	cm (*×)	
Centered rectangular	2mm	D_{2}	(*22)	[2]	4	Between	cmm (2*22)	pgg (22×)
Square	4	C_{4}	(44)	[4]^{+}	4	None	p4 (442)	
Square	4mm	D_{4}	(*44)	[4]	8	Both	p4m (*442)	p4g (4*2)
Hexagonal	3	C_{3}	(33)	[3]^{+}	3	None	p3 (333)	
Hexagonal	3m	D_{3}	(*33)	[3]	6	Between	p3m1 (*333)	p31m (3*3)
Hexagonal	6	C_{6}	(66)	[6]^{+}	6	None	p6 (632)	
Hexagonal	6mm	D_{6}	(*66)	[6]	12	Both	p6m (*632)	

For each geometric class, the possible arithmetic classes are

- None: no reflection lines
- Along: reflection lines along lattice directions
- Between: reflection lines halfway in between lattice directions
- Both: reflection lines both along and between lattice directions

== Table of space groups in 3 dimensions ==
№	Crystal system, (count), Bravais lattice	Point group					Space groups (international short symbol)
№	Crystal system, (count), Bravais lattice	Int'l	Schön.	Orbifold	Cox.	Ord.	Space groups (international short symbol)
1	Triclinic; (2)	1	C_{1}	11	[ ]^{+}	1	P1
2	Triclinic; (2)	1̅	C_{i}	1×	[2^{+},2^{+}]	2	P1̅
3–5	Monoclinic; (13)	2	C_{2}	22	[2]^{+}	2	P2, P2_{1}; C2
6–9	Monoclinic; (13)	m	C_{s}	*11	[ ]	2	Pm, Pc; Cm, Cc
10–15	Monoclinic; (13)	2/m	C_{2h}	2*	[2,2^{+}]	4	P2/m, P2_{1}/m; C2/m, P2/c, P2_{1}/c; C2/c
16–24	Orthorhombic; (59); ;	222	D_{2}	222	[2,2]^{+}	4	P222, P222_{1}, P2_{1}2_{1}2, P2_{1}2_{1}2_{1}; C222_{1}, C222; F222; I222, I2_{1}2_{1}2_{1}
25–46	Orthorhombic; (59); ;	mm2	C_{2v}	*22	[2]	4	Pmm2, Pmc2_{1}, Pcc2, Pma2, Pca2_{1}, Pnc2, Pmn2_{1}, Pba2, Pna2_{1}, Pnn2; Cmm2, Cmc2_{1}, Ccc2, Amm2, Aem2, Ama2, Aea2; Fmm2, Fdd2; Imm2, Iba2, Ima2
47–74	Orthorhombic; (59); ;	mmm	D_{2h}	*222	[2,2]	8	Pmmm, Pnnn, Pccm, Pban, Pmma, Pnna, Pmna, Pcca, Pbam, Pccn, Pbcm, Pnnm, Pmmn, Pbcn, Pbca, Pnma; Cmcm, Cmce, Cmmm, Cccm, Cmme, Ccce; Fmmm, Fddd; Immm, Ibam, Ibca, Imma
75–80	Tetragonal; (68)	4	C_{4}	44	[4]^{+}	4	P4, P4_{1}, P4_{2}, P4_{3}, I4, I4_{1}
81–82	Tetragonal; (68)	4̅	S_{4}	2×	[2^{+},4^{+}]	4	P4̅, I4̅
83–88	Tetragonal; (68)	4/m	C_{4h}	4*	[2,4^{+}]	8	P4/m, P4_{2}/m, P4/n, P4_{2}/n; I4/m, I4_{1}/a
89–98	Tetragonal; (68)	422	D_{4}	224	[2,4]^{+}	8	P422, P42_{1}2, P4_{1}22, P4_{1}2_{1}2, P4_{2}22, P4_{2}2_{1}2, P4_{3}22, P4_{3}2_{1}2; I422, I4_{1}22
99–110	Tetragonal; (68)	4mm	C_{4v}	*44	[4]	8	P4mm, P4bm, P4_{2}cm, P4_{2}nm, P4cc, P4nc, P4_{2}mc, P4_{2}bc; I4mm, I4cm, I4_{1}md, I4_{1}cd
111–122	Tetragonal; (68)	4̅2m	D_{2d}	2*2	[2^{+},4]	8	P4̅2m, P4̅2c, P4̅2_{1}m, P4̅2_{1}c, P4̅m2, P4̅c2, P4̅b2, P4̅n2; I4̅m2, I4̅c2, I4̅2m, I4̅2d
123–142	Tetragonal; (68)	4/mmm	D_{4h}	*224	[2,4]	16	P4/mmm, P4/mcc, P4/nbm, P4/nnc, P4/mbm, P4/mnc, P4/nmm, P4/ncc, P4_{2}/mmc, P4_{2}/mcm, P4_{2}/nbc, P4_{2}/nnm, P4_{2}/mbc, P4_{2}/mnm, P4_{2}/nmc, P4_{2}/ncm; I4/mmm, I4/mcm, I4_{1}/amd, I4_{1}/acd
143–146	Trigonal; (25);	3	C_{3}	33	[3]^{+}	3	P3, P3_{1}, P3_{2}; R3
147–148	Trigonal; (25);	3̅	S_{6}	3×	[2^{+},6^{+}]	6	P3̅, R3̅
149–155	Trigonal; (25);	32	D_{3}	223	[2,3]^{+}	6	P312, P321, P3_{1}12, P3_{1}21, P3_{2}12, P3_{2}21; R32
156–161	Trigonal; (25);	3m	C_{3v}	*33	[3]	6	P3m1, P31m, P3c1, P31c; R3m, R3c
162–167	Trigonal; (25);	3̅m	D_{3d}	2*3	[2^{+},6]	12	P3̅1m, P3̅1c, P3̅m1, P3̅c1; R3̅m, R3̅c
168–173	Hexagonal; (27)	6	C_{6}	66	[6]^{+}	6	P6, P6_{1}, P6_{5}, P6_{2}, P6_{4}, P6_{3}
174	Hexagonal; (27)	6̅	C_{3h}	3*	[2,3^{+}]	6	P6̅
175–176	Hexagonal; (27)	6/m	C_{6h}	6*	[2,6^{+}]	12	P6/m, P6_{3}/m
177–182	Hexagonal; (27)	622	D_{6}	226	[2,6]^{+}	12	P622, P6_{1}22, P6_{5}22, P6_{2}22, P6_{4}22, P6_{3}22
183–186	Hexagonal; (27)	6mm	C_{6v}	*66	[6]	12	P6mm, P6cc, P6_{3}cm, P6_{3}mc
187–190	Hexagonal; (27)	6̅m2	D_{3h}	*223	[2,3]	12	P6̅m2, P6̅c2, P6̅2m, P6̅2c
191–194	Hexagonal; (27)	6/mmm	D_{6h}	*226	[2,6]	24	P6/mmm, P6/mcc, P6_{3}/mcm, P6_{3}/mmc
195–199	Cubic; (36)	23	T	332	[3,3]^{+}	12	P23, F23, I23; P2_{1}3, I2_{1}3
200–206	Cubic; (36)	m3̅	T_{h}	3*2	[3^{+},4]	24	Pm3̅, Pn3̅, Fm3̅, Fd3̅, Im3̅, Pa3̅, Ia3̅
207–214	Cubic; (36)	432	O	432	[3,4]^{+}	24	P432, P4_{2}32; F432, F4_{1}32; I432; P4_{3}32, P4_{1}32, I4_{1}32
215–220	Cubic; (36)	4̅3m	T_{d}	*332	[3,3]	24	P4̅3m, F4̅3m, I4̅3m; P4̅3n, F4̅3c, I4̅3d
221–230	Cubic; (36)	m3̅m	O_{h}	*432	[3,4]	48	Pm3̅m, Pn3̅n, Pm3̅n, Pn3̅m; Fm3̅m, Fm3̅c, Fd3̅m, Fd3̅c; Im3̅m, Ia3̅d

Note: An e plane is a double glide plane, one having glides in two different directions. They are found in seven orthorhombic, five tetragonal and five cubic space groups, all with centered lattice. The use of the symbol e became official circa 2002.

The lattice system can be found as follows. If the crystal system is not trigonal then the lattice system is of the same type. If the crystal system is trigonal, then the lattice system is hexagonal unless the space group is one of the seven in the rhombohedral lattice system consisting of the 7 trigonal space groups in the table above whose name begins with R. (The term rhombohedral system is also sometimes used as an alternative name for the whole trigonal system.) The hexagonal lattice system is larger than the hexagonal crystal system, and consists of the hexagonal crystal system together with the 18 groups of the trigonal crystal system other than the seven whose names begin with R.

The Bravais lattice of the space group is determined by the lattice system together with the initial letter of its name, which for the non-rhombohedral groups is P, I, F, A or C, standing for the principal, body centered, face centered, A-face centered or C-face centered lattices. There are seven rhombohedral space groups, with initial letter R.

== Derivation of the crystal class from the space group ==
1. Leave out the Bravais type
2. Convert all symmetry elements with translational components into their respective symmetry elements without translation symmetry (Glide planes are converted into simple mirror planes; Screw axes are converted into simple axes of rotation)
3. Axes of rotation, rotoinversion axes and mirror planes remain unchanged.
