= Symmetry (geometry) =

Geometrical property

A drawing of a butterfly with bilateral symmetry, with left and right sides as mirror images of each other.

In geometry, an object has symmetry if there is an operation or transformation (such as translation, scaling, rotation or reflection) that maps the figure/object onto itself (i.e., the object has an invariance under the transform). Thus, a symmetry can be thought of as an immunity to change. For instance, a circle rotated about its center will have the same shape and size as the original circle, as all points before and after the transform would be indistinguishable. A circle is thus said to be symmetric under rotation or to have rotational symmetry. If the isometry is the reflection of a plane figure about a line, then the figure is said to have reflectional symmetry or line symmetry; it is also possible for a figure/object to have more than one line of symmetry.

The types of symmetries that are possible for a geometric object depend on the set of geometric transforms available, and on what object properties should remain unchanged after a transformation. Because the composition of two transforms is also a transform and every transform has, by definition, an inverse transform that undoes it, the set of transforms under which an object is symmetric form a mathematical group, the symmetry group of the object.

== Euclidean symmetries in general ==
The most common group of transforms applied to objects are termed the Euclidean group of "isometries", which are distance-preserving transformations in space commonly referred to as two-dimensional or three-dimensional (i.e., in plane geometry or solid geometry Euclidean spaces). These isometries consist of reflections, rotations, translations, and combinations of these basic operations. Under an isometric transformation, a geometric object is said to be symmetric if, after transformation, the object is indistinguishable from the object before the transformation. A geometric object is typically symmetric only under a subset or "subgroup" of all isometries. The kinds of isometry subgroups are described below, followed by other kinds of transform groups, and by the types of object invariance that are possible in geometry.

By the Cartan–Dieudonné theorem, an orthogonal transformation in n-dimensional space can be represented by the composition of at most n reflections.

Basic isometries by dimension
	1D		2D		3D		4D	
Reflections	Point	Affine	Point	Affine	Point	Affine	Point	Affine
1	Reflection		Reflection		Reflection		Reflection	
2		Translation	Rotation	Translation	Rotation	Translation	Rotation	Translation
3				Transflection	Rotoreflection	Transflection	Rotoreflection	Transflection
4						Rotary translation	Double rotation	Rotary translation
5								Rotary transflection

== Reflectional symmetry ==
Reflectional symmetry, linear symmetry, mirror symmetry, mirror-image symmetry, or bilateral symmetry is symmetry with respect to reflection.

In one dimension, there is a point of symmetry about which reflection takes place; in two dimensions, there is an axis of symmetry (a.k.a., line of symmetry), and in three dimensions there is a plane of symmetry. An object or figure for which every point has a one-to-one mapping onto another, equidistant from and on opposite sides of a common plane is called mirror symmetric (for more, see mirror image).

The axis of symmetry of a two-dimensional figure is a line such that, if a perpendicular is constructed, any two points lying on the perpendicular at equal distances from the axis of symmetry are identical. Another way to think about it is that if the shape were to be folded in half over the axis, the two halves would be identical as mirror images of each other. For example. a square has four axes of symmetry, because there are four different ways to fold it and have the edges match each other. Another example would be that of a circle, which has infinitely many axes of symmetry passing through its center for the same reason.

If the letter T is reflected along a vertical axis, it appears the same. This is sometimes called vertical symmetry. Thus one can describe this phenomenon unambiguously by saying that "T has a vertical symmetry axis", or that "T has left-right symmetry".

The triangles with reflection symmetry are isosceles, the quadrilaterals with this symmetry are kites and isosceles trapezoids.

For each line or plane of reflection, the symmetry group is isomorphic with C_{s} (see point groups in three dimensions for more), one of the three types of order two (involutions), hence algebraically isomorphic to C_{2}. The fundamental domain is a half-plane or half-space.

== Point reflection and other involutive isometries ==
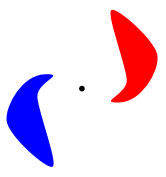
In 2 dimensions, a point reflection is a 180 degree rotation.

Reflection symmetry can be generalized to other isometries of m-dimensional space which are involutions, such as

(x_{1}, ..., x_{m}) ↦ (−x_{1}, ..., −x_{k}, x_{k+1}, ..., x_{m})

in a certain system of Cartesian coordinates. This reflects the space along an (m−k)-dimensional affine subspace. If k = m, then such a transformation is known as a point reflection, or an inversion through a point. On the plane (m = 2), a point reflection is the same as a half-turn (180°) rotation; see below. Antipodal symmetry is an alternative name for a point reflection symmetry through the origin.

Such a "reflection" preserves orientation if and only if k is an even number. This implies that for m = 3 (as well as for other odd m), a point reflection changes the orientation of the space, like a mirror-image symmetry. That explains why in physics, the term P-symmetry (P stands for parity) is used for both point reflection and mirror symmetry. Since a point reflection in three dimensions changes a left-handed coordinate system into a right-handed coordinate system, symmetry under a point reflection is also called a left-right symmetry.

== Rotational symmetry ==
The triskelion has 3-fold rotational symmetry.

Rotational symmetry is symmetry with respect to some or all rotations in m-dimensional Euclidean space. Rotations are direct isometries, which are isometries that preserve orientation. Therefore, a symmetry group of rotational symmetry is a subgroup of the special Euclidean group E^{+}(m).

Symmetry with respect to all rotations about all points implies translational symmetry with respect to all translations (because translations are compositions of rotations about distinct points), and the symmetry group is the whole E^{+}(m). This does not apply for objects because it makes space homogeneous, but it may apply for physical laws.

For symmetry with respect to rotations about a point, one can take that point as origin. These rotations form the special orthogonal group SO(m), which can be represented by the group of m × m orthogonal matrices with determinant 1. For m = 3, this is the rotation group SO(3).

Phrased slightly differently, the rotation group of an object is the symmetry group within E^{+}(m), the group of rigid motions; that is, the intersection of the full symmetry group and the group of rigid motions. For chiral objects, it is the same as the full symmetry group.

Laws of physics are SO(3)-invariant if they do not distinguish different directions in space. Because of Noether's theorem, rotational symmetry of a physical system is equivalent to the angular momentum conservation law. For more, see rotational invariance.

== Translational symmetry ==
A frieze pattern with translational symmetry

Translational symmetry leaves an object invariant under a discrete or continuous group of translations $\scriptstyle T_a(p) \;=\; p \,+\, a$. The illustration on the right shows four congruent footprints generated by translations along the arrow. If the line of footprints were to extend to infinity in both directions, then they would have a discrete translational symmetry; any translation that mapped one footprint onto another would leave the whole line unchanged.

== Glide reflection symmetry ==
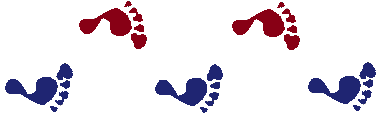
A frieze pattern with glide reflection symmetry

In 2D, a glide reflection symmetry (also called a glide plane symmetry in 3D, and a transflection in general) means that a reflection in a line or plane combined with a translation along the line or in the plane, results in the same object (such as in the case of footprints). The composition of two glide reflections results in a translation symmetry with twice the translation vector. The symmetry group comprising glide reflections and associated translations is the frieze group p11g, and is isomorphic with the infinite cyclic group Z.

=== Rotoreflection symmetry ===
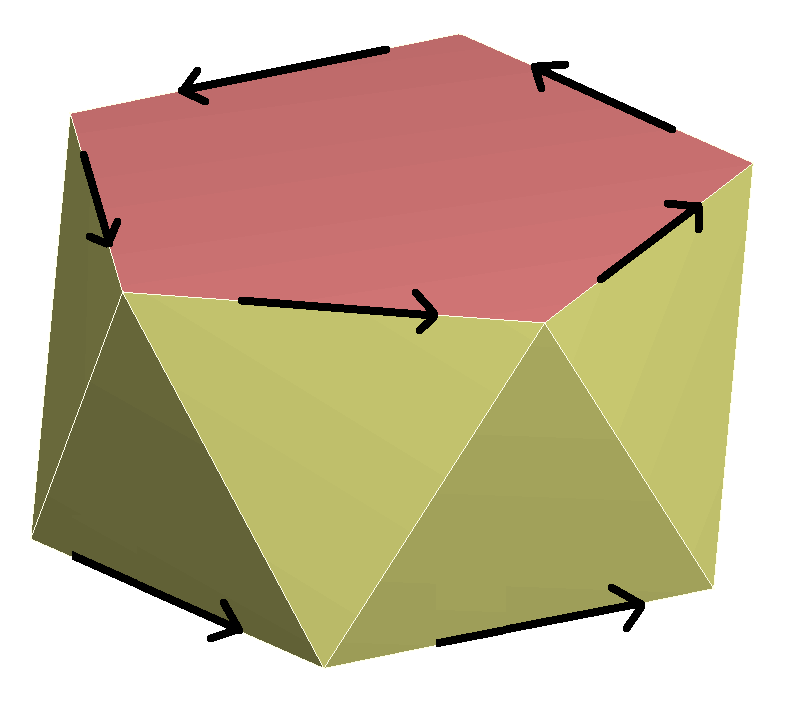
A pentagonal antiprism with marked edges shows rotoreflectional symmetry, with an order of 10.

In 3D, a rotary reflection, rotoreflection or improper rotation is a rotation about an axis combined with reflection in a plane perpendicular to that axis. The symmetry groups associated with rotoreflections include:

- if the rotation angle has no common divisor with 360°, the symmetry group is not discrete.
- if the rotoreflection has a 2n-fold rotation angle (angle of 180°/n), the symmetry group is S_{2n} of order 2n (not to be confused with symmetric groups, for which the same notation is used; the abstract group is C_{2n}). A special case is n = 1, an inversion, because it does not depend on the axis and the plane. It is characterized by just the point of inversion.
- The group C_{nh} (angle of 360°/n); for odd n, this is generated by a single symmetry, and the abstract group is C_{2n}, for even n. This is not a basic symmetry but a combination.

For more, see point groups in three dimensions.

== Helical symmetry ==
In 3D geometry and higher, a screw axis (or rotary translation) is a combination of a rotation and a translation along the rotation axis.

Helical symmetry is the kind of symmetry seen in everyday objects such as springs, Slinky toys, drill bits, and augers. The concept of helical symmetry can be visualized as the tracing in three-dimensional space that results from rotating an object at a constant angular speed, while simultaneously translating at a constant linear speed along its axis of rotation. At any point in time, these two motions combine to give a coiling angle that helps define the properties of the traced helix. When the tracing object rotates quickly and translates slowly, the coiling angle will be close to 0°. Conversely, if the object rotates slowly and translates quickly, the coiling angle will approach 90°.

A continuous helix

Three main classes of helical symmetry can be distinguished, based on the interplay of the angle of coiling and translation symmetries along the axis:

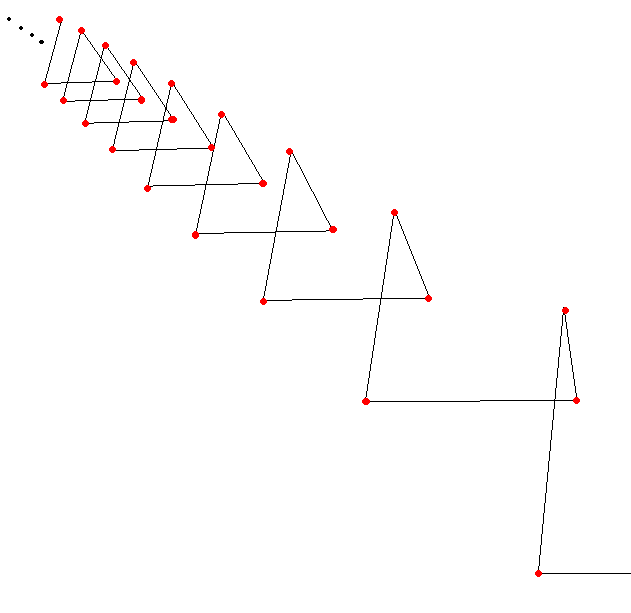
A regular skew-apeirogon has a discrete (3-fold here) screw-axis symmetry, drawn in perspective.

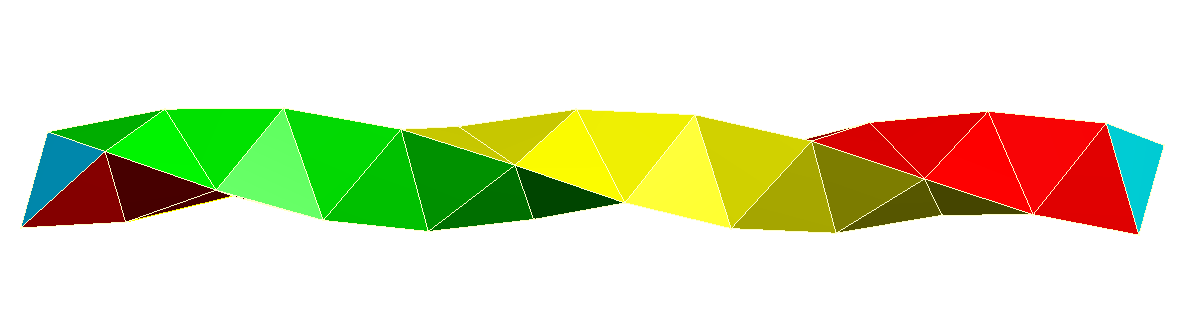
The Boerdijk–Coxeter helix, constructed by augmented regular tetrahedra, is an example of a screw axis symmetry that is nonperiodic.

- Infinite helical symmetry: If there are no distinguishing features along the length of a helix or helix-like object, the object will have infinite symmetry much like that of a circle, but with the additional requirement of translation along the long axis of the object—to return it to its original appearance. A helix-like object is one that has at every point the regular angle of coiling of a helix, but which can also have a cross section of indefinitely high complexity, provided only that precisely the same cross section exists (usually after a rotation) at every point along the length of the object. Simple examples include evenly coiled springs, slinkies, drill bits, and augers. Stated more precisely, an object has infinite helical symmetries if for any small rotation of the object around its central axis, there exists a point nearby (the translation distance) on that axis at which the object will appear exactly as it did before. It is this infinite helical symmetry that gives rise to the curious illusion of movement along the length of an auger or screw bit that is being rotated. It also provides the mechanically useful ability of such devices to move materials along their length, provided that they are combined with a force such as gravity or friction that allows the materials to resist simply rotating along with the drill or auger.
- n-fold helical symmetry: If the requirement that every cross section of the helical object be identical is relaxed, then additional lesser helical symmetries would become possible. For example, the cross section of the helical object may change, but may still repeat itself in a regular fashion along the axis of the helical object. Consequently, objects of this type will exhibit a symmetry after a rotation by some fixed angle θ and a translation by some fixed distance, but will not in general be invariant for any rotation angle. If the angle of rotation at which the symmetry occurs divides evenly into a full circle (360°), then the result is the helical equivalent of a regular polygon. This case is called n-fold helical symmetry, where n = 360° (such as the case of a double helix). This concept can be further generalized to include cases where $\scriptstyle m\theta$ is a multiple of 360° – that is, the cycle does eventually repeat, but only after more than one full rotation of the helical object.
- Non-repeating helical symmetry: This is the case in which the angle of rotation θ required to observe the symmetry is irrational. The angle of rotation never repeats exactly, no matter how many times the helix is rotated. Such symmetries are created by using a non-repeating point group in two dimensions. DNA, with approximately 10.5 base pairs per turn, is an example of this type of non-repeating helical symmetry.

== Double rotation symmetry ==
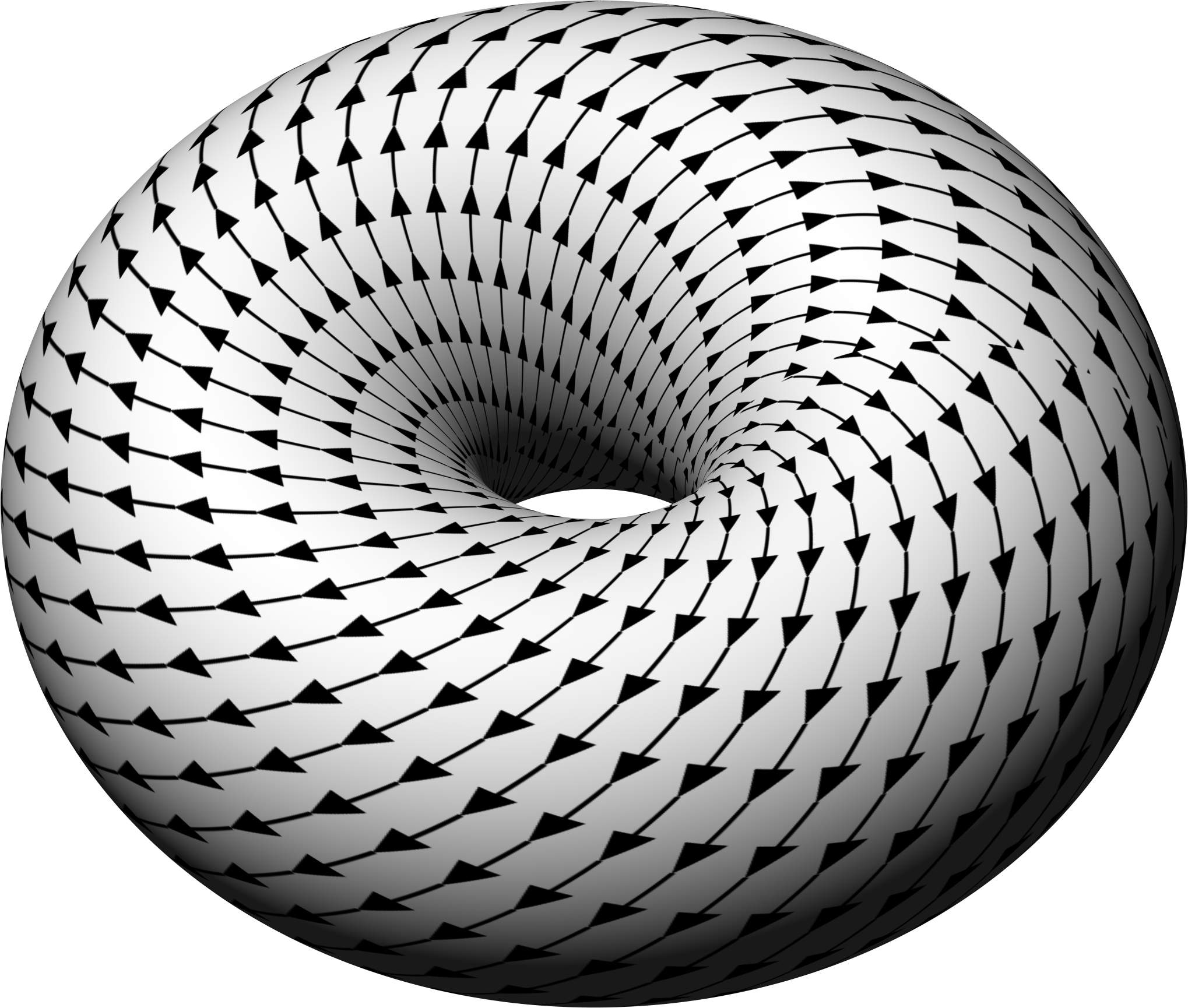
A 4D clifford torus, stereographically projected into 3D, looks like a torus. A double rotation can be seen as a helical path.

In 4D, a double rotation symmetry can be generated as the composite of two orthogonal rotations. It is similar to 3D screw axis which is the composite of a rotation and an orthogonal translation.

== Non-isometric symmetries ==
A wider definition of geometric symmetry allows operations from a larger group than the Euclidean group of isometries. Examples of larger geometric symmetry groups are:

- The group of similarity transformations; i.e., affine transformations represented by a matrix A that is a scalar times an orthogonal matrix. Thus homothety is added, self-similarity is considered a symmetry.
- The group of affine transformations represented by a matrix A with determinant 1 or −1; i.e., the transformations which preserve area.
  This adds, e.g., oblique reflection symmetry.
- The group of all bijective affine transformations.
- The group of Möbius transformations which preserve cross-ratios.
  This adds, e.g., inversive reflections such as circle reflection on the plane.

In Felix Klein's Erlangen program, each possible group of symmetries defines a geometry in which objects that are related by a member of the symmetry group are considered to be equivalent. For example, the Euclidean group defines Euclidean geometry, whereas the group of Möbius transformations defines projective geometry.

== Scale symmetry and fractals ==
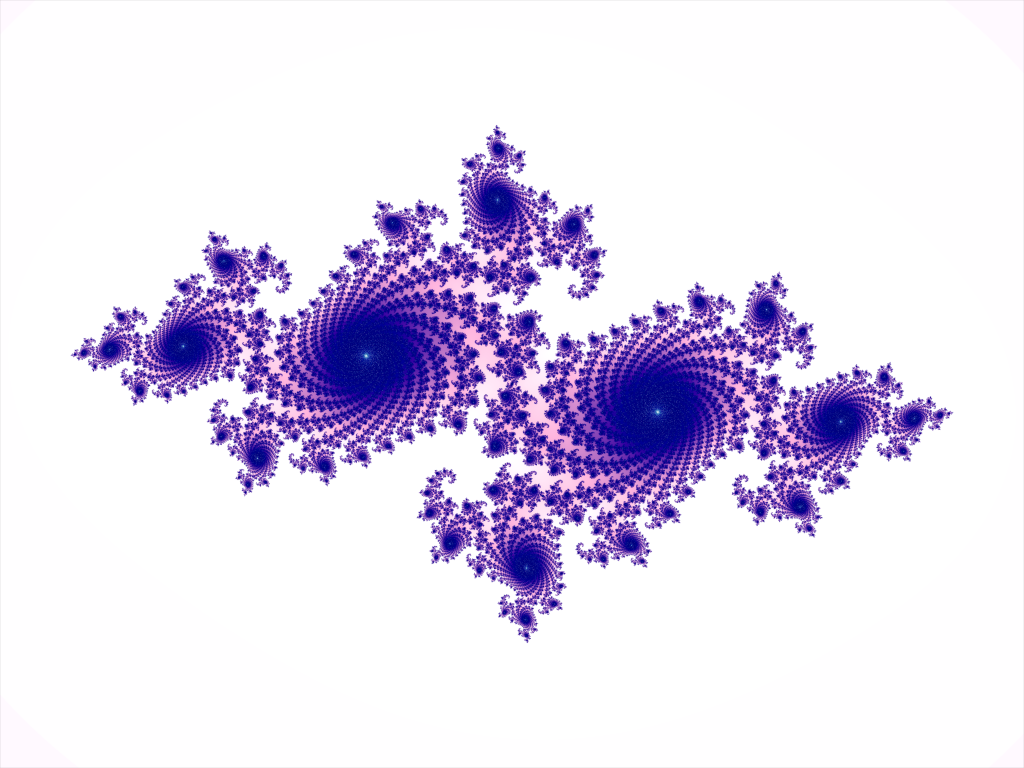
A Julia set has scale symmetry

Scale symmetry means that if an object is expanded or reduced in size, the new object has the same properties as the original. This self-similarity is seen in many natural structures such as cumulus clouds, lightning, ferns and coastlines, over a wide range of scales. It is generally not found in gravitationally bound structures, for example the shape of the legs of an elephant and a mouse (so-called allometric scaling). Similarly, if a soft wax candle were enlarged to the size of a tall tree, it would immediately collapse under its own weight.

A more subtle form of scale symmetry is demonstrated by fractals. As conceived by Benoît Mandelbrot, fractals are a mathematical concept in which the structure of a complex form looks similar at any degree of magnification, well seen in the Mandelbrot set. A coast is an example of a naturally occurring fractal, since it retains similar-appearing complexity at every level from the view of a satellite to a microscopic examination of how the water laps up against individual grains of sand. The branching of trees, which enables small twigs to stand in for full trees in dioramas, is another example.

Because fractals can generate the appearance of patterns in nature, they have a beauty and familiarity not typically seen with mathematically generated functions. Fractals have also found a place in computer-generated movie effects, where their ability to create complex curves with fractal symmetries results in more realistic virtual worlds.

== Abstract symmetry ==
=== Klein's view ===
With every geometry, Felix Klein associated an underlying group of symmetries. The hierarchy of geometries is thus mathematically represented as a hierarchy of these groups, and hierarchy of their invariants. For example, lengths, angles and areas are preserved with respect to the Euclidean group of symmetries, while only the incidence structure and the cross-ratio are preserved under the most general projective transformations. A concept of parallelism, which is preserved in affine geometry, is not meaningful in projective geometry. Then, by abstracting the underlying groups of symmetries from the geometries, the relationships between them can be re-established at the group level. Since the group of affine geometry is a subgroup of the group of projective geometry, any notion invariant in projective geometry is a priori meaningful in affine geometry; but not the other way round. If you add required symmetries, you have a more powerful theory but fewer concepts and theorems (which will be deeper and more general).

=== Thurston's view ===
William Thurston introduced a similar version of symmetries in geometry. A model geometry is a simply connected smooth manifold X together with a transitive action of a Lie group G on X with compact stabilizers. The Lie group can be thought of as the group of symmetries of the geometry.

A model geometry is called maximal if G is maximal among groups acting smoothly and transitively on X with compact stabilizers, i.e. if it is the maximal group of symmetries. Sometimes this condition is included in the definition of a model geometry.

A geometric structure on a manifold M is a diffeomorphism from M to X/Γ for some model geometry X, where Γ is a discrete subgroup of G acting freely on X. If a given manifold admits a geometric structure, then it admits one whose model is maximal.

A 3-dimensional model geometry X is relevant to the geometrization conjecture if it is maximal and if there is at least one compact manifold with a geometric structure modelled on X. Thurston classified the 8 model geometries satisfying these conditions; they are listed below and are sometimes called Thurston geometries. (There are also uncountably many model geometries without compact quotients.)

== See also ==
- Fractal
- Symmetric relation
