= Line group =

A line group is a mathematical way of describing symmetries associated with moving along a line. These symmetries may include repeating along that line, making that line a one-dimensional lattice. Most line groups have more than one dimension, and involve those dimensions in its isometries or symmetry transformations.

One constructs a line group by taking a point group in the full dimensions of the space and adding translations (sometimes with a twist) along the line to each of the point group's elements, in the fashion of constructing a space group. Although a point group by definition holds at least one point stationary, this is not necessarily true of a line group because of the translations.

== One-dimensional ==
There are 2 one-dimensional line groups. They are the infinite limits of the discrete two-dimensional point groups C_{n} and D_{n}:

Notations				Description	Example
Intl	Orbifold	Coxeter	P.G.	Description	Example
p1	∞∞	[∞]^{+}	C_{∞}	Translations. Abstract group Z, the integers under addition	... --> --> --> --> ...
p1m	*∞∞	[∞]	D_{∞}	Reflections. Abstract group Dih_{∞}, the infinite dihedral group	... --> <-- --> <-- ...

== Two-dimensional ==
There are 7 frieze groups, which involve reflections along the line, reflections perpendicular to the line, and 180° rotations in the two dimensions.

7 frieze group notations and diagram
IUC	Orbifold	Schönflies	Conway	Coxeter	Fundamental domain
p1	∞∞	C_{∞}	C_{∞}	[∞,1]^{+}	
p1m1	*∞∞	C_{∞v}	CD_{2∞}	[∞,1]	
p11g	∞x	S_{2∞}	CC_{2∞}	[∞^{+},2^{+}]	
p11m	∞*	C_{∞h}	±C_{∞}	[∞^{+},2]	
p2	22∞	D_{∞}	D_{2∞}	[∞,2]^{+}	
p2mg	2*∞	D_{∞d}	DD_{4∞}	[∞,2^{+}]	
p2mm	*22∞	D_{∞h}	±D_{2∞}	[∞,2]	

== Three-dimensional ==
There are 13 infinite families of three-dimensional line groups, derived from the 7 infinite families of axial three-dimensional point groups. As with space groups in general, line groups with the same point group may have different patterns of offsets (two or even three), giving line groups in different families. Each of the families is based on a group of rotations around the axis with order n, where n can be any positive integer including 1. As mentioned earlier, there is not necessarily any point where the point group applies. For example, in the line group P2_{1}/m, associated with the point group C_{2h} (called 2/m in the H-M notation), there is no point with C_{2h} symmetry, because the two-fold rotation is converted into a screw displacement.

The groups are listed in Hermann-Mauguin notation, and for the point groups, Schönflies notation. There appears to be no comparable notation for the line groups. These groups can also be interpreted as patterns of wallpaper groups wrapped around a cylinder n times and infinitely repeating along the cylinder's axis, much like the three-dimensional point groups and the frieze groups. A table of these groups:

Point group					Line group						
H-M		Schönf.	Orb.	Cox.	H-M		Offset type	Wallpaper			Coxeter [∞_{h},2,p_{v}]
Even n	Odd n	Schönf.	Orb.	Cox.	Even n	Odd n	Offset type	IUC	Orbifold	Diagram	Coxeter [∞_{h},2,p_{v}]
n		C_{n}	nn	[n]^{+}	Pn_{q}		Helical: q	p1	o		[∞^{+},2,n^{+}]
2̅n̅	n̅	S_{2n}	n×	[2^{+},2n^{+}]	P2̅n̅	Pn̅	None	p11g, pg(h)	××		[(∞,2)^{+},2n^{+}]
n/m	2̅n̅	C_{nh}	n*	[2,n^{+}]	Pn/m	P2̅n̅	None	p11m, pm(h)	**		[∞^{+},2,n]
2n/m		C_{2nh}	(2n)*	[2,2n^{+}]	P2n_{n}/m		Zigzag	c11m, cm(h)	*×		[∞^{+},2^{+},2n]
nmm	nm	C_{nv}	*nn	[n]	Pnmm	Pnm	None	p1m1, pm(v)	**		[∞,2,n^{+}]
nmm	nm	C_{nv}	*nn	[n]	Pncc	Pnc	None	p1g1, pg(v)	××		[∞^{+},(2,n)^{+}]
2nmm		C_{2nv}	*(2n)(2n)	[2n]	P2n_{n}mc		Zigzag	c1m1, cm(v)	*×		[∞,2^{+},2n^{+}]
n22	n2	D_{n}	n22	[2,n]^{+}	Pn_{q}22	Pn_{q}2	Helical: q	p2	2222		[∞,2,n]^{+}
2̅n̅2m	n̅m	D_{nd}	2*n	[2^{+},2n]	P2̅n̅2m	Pn̅m	None	p2gm, pmg(v)	22*		[(∞,2)^{+},2n]
2̅n̅2m	n̅m	D_{nd}	2*n	[2^{+},2n]	P2̅n̅2c	Pn̅c	None	p2gg, pgg	22×		[^{+}(∞,(2),2n)^{+}]
n/mmm	2̅n̅2m	D_{nh}	*n22	[2,n]	Pn/mmm	P2̅n̅2m	None	p2mm, pmm	*2222		[∞,2,n]
n/mmm	2̅n̅2m	D_{nh}	*n22	[2,n]	Pn/mcc	P2̅n̅2c	None	p2mg, pmg(h)	22*		[∞,(2,n)^{+}]
2n/mmm		D_{2nh}	*(2n)22	[2,2n]	P2n_{n}/mcm		Zigzag	c2mm, cmm	2*22		[∞,2^{+},2n]

The offset types are:

- None. Offsets along the axis include no offsets around it to within repeats of the unit cell around the axis.
- Helical offset with helicity q. For a unit offset along the axis, there is an offset of q around it. A point that has repeated offsets will trace out a helix.
- Zigzag offset. Helical offset of 1/2 relative to the unit cell around the axis.

Note that the wallpaper groups pm, pg, cm, and pmg appear twice. Each appearance has a different orientation relative to the line-group axis; reflection parallel (h) or perpendicular (v). The other groups have no such orientation: p1, p2, pmm, pgg, cmm.

If the point group is constrained to be a crystallographic point group, a symmetry of some three-dimensional lattice, then the resulting line group is called a rod group. There are 75 rod groups.

- The Coxeter notation is based on the rectangular wallpaper groups, with the vertical axis wrapped into a cylinder of symmetry order n or 2n.

Going to the continuum limit, with n to ∞, the possible point groups become C_{∞}, C_{∞h}, C_{∞v}, D_{∞}, and D_{∞h}, and the line groups have the appropriate possible offsets, with the exception of zigzag.

=== Helical symmetry ===
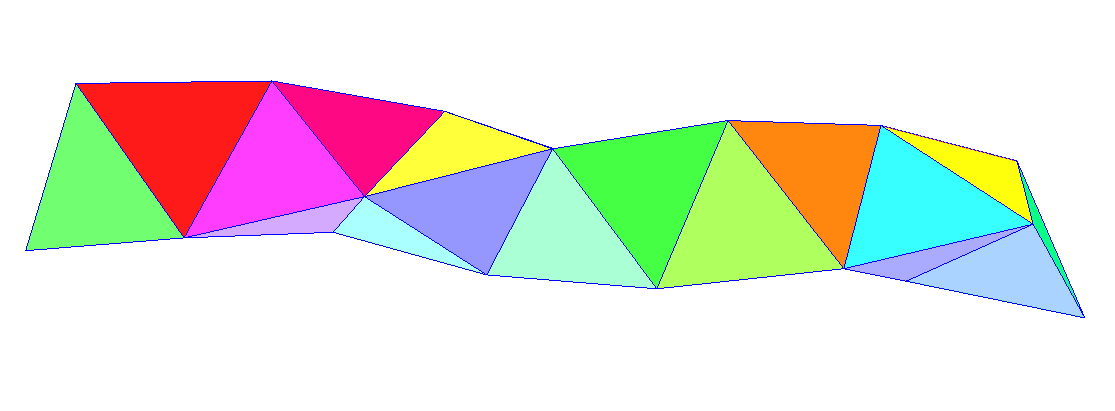
The Boerdijk–Coxeter helix, a chain of regular tetrahedra, shows helical symmetry without an integer number of turns to repeat an original orientation.

The groups C_{n}(q) and D_{n}(q) (those based on the point groups C_{n} and D_{n}) express the symmetries of helical objects. C_{n}(q) is for n helices oriented in the same direction, while D_{n}(q) is for n non-oriented helices or n pairs helices with alternating orientations. Reversing the sign of q creates a mirror image, reversing the helices' chirality or handedness.

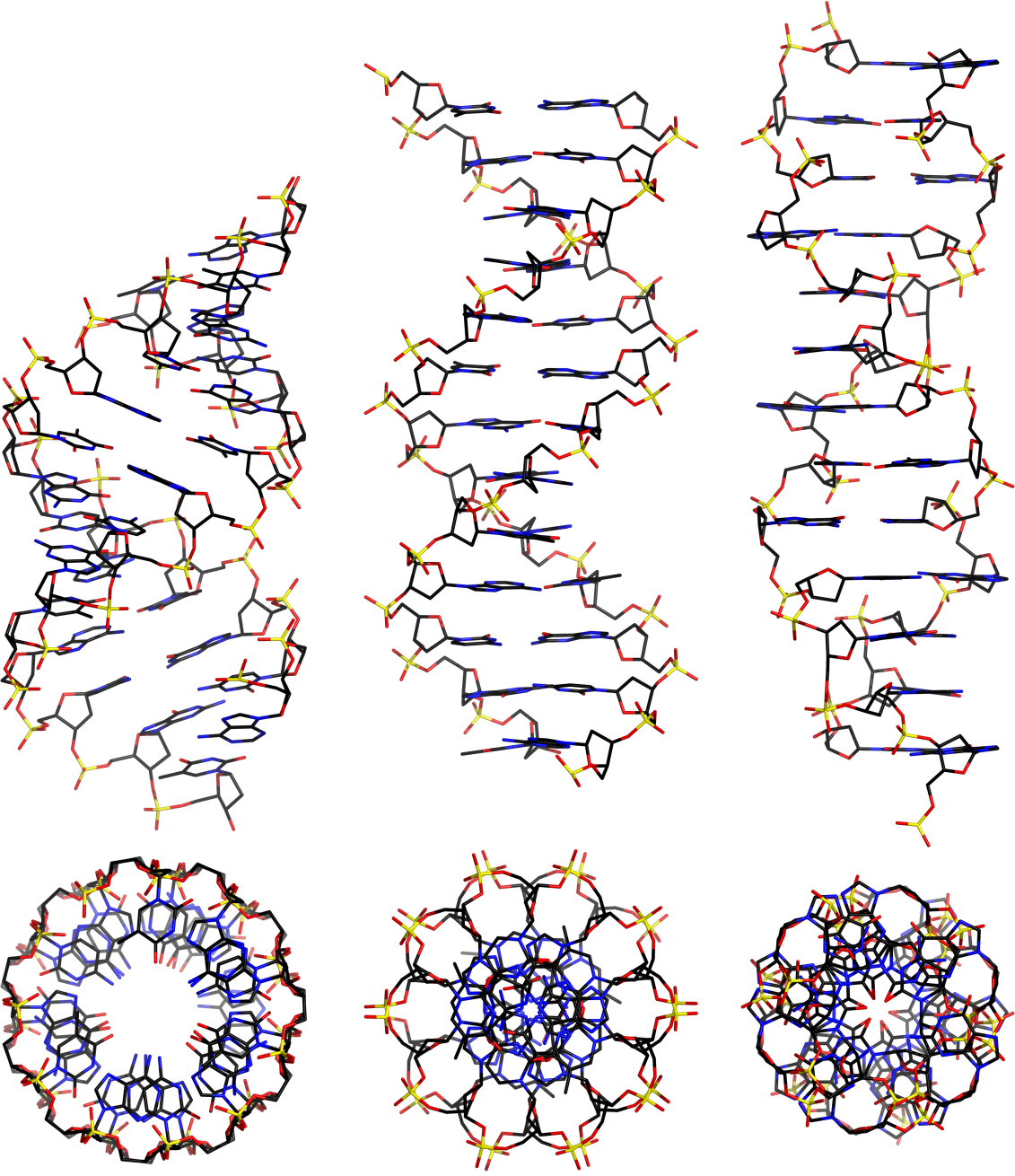
A-DNA, B-DNA, and Z-DNA

Nucleic acids (DNA and RNA) are well known for their helical symmetry. Single strands of nucleic acids have a well-defined direction, with line group C_{1}(q) if we ignore the identities of the nucleic bases. If we do not ignore the bases, then the strand must consist of some sequence of bases that repeats to have this symmetry. Double stranded nucleic acid has two strands of opposite directions, but not on opposite sides of the helix axis because the line group is D_{1}(q) (if we ignore the bases) rather than D_{2}(q). If we do not ignore the bases, then to have this symmetry it must consist of repeats of a section, such as "TA" or "TACTAGTA", made up of two complementary halves with opposite order. There are three forms of DNA, with different details but the same line group.

Microtubules are made up of helical chains of alternating α-tubulin and β-tubulin, called protofilaments. In the usual form, thirteen such chains wind together around a common axis, touching one another, and going from a dimer in one protofilament to the dimer in the next and so on to get back to the first protofilament results in being three dimers further along it. The line group is C_{1}(q). A dimer of α-tubulin and β-tubulin can be carried by a rotation of around 4/13 of 360° and a displacement in the direction of the axis to coincide with the position of another such dimer. This operation is a generator for the group. Three repetitions of this generating element comes to the neighboring dimer to the first one, in the next protofilament, and 13 repetitions arrives at the next dimer in the original protofilament.

Another example having the line group C_{1}(q) is the rod-like structures found in many viruses. For example, the tobacco mosaic virus has a helix of protein surrounding the RNA. The generating element combines a rotation of around 1/17 of 360° with a small displacement in the direction of the axis.

== See also ==
- Point group
- Space group
- One-dimensional symmetry group
- Frieze group
- Rod group
