= Layer group =

In mathematics, a layer group is a three-dimensional extension of a wallpaper group, with reflections in the third dimension. It is a space group with a two-dimensional lattice, meaning that it is symmetric over repeats in the two lattice directions. The symmetry group at each lattice point is an axial crystallographic point group with the main axis being perpendicular to the lattice plane.

Table of the 80 layer groups, organized by crystal system or lattice type, and by their point groups

Triclinic
1	p1	2	p1̅						
Monoclinic/inclined
3	p112	4	p11m	5	p11a	6	p112/m	7	p112/a
Monoclinic/orthogonal
8	p211	9	p2_{1}11	10	c211	11	pm11	12	pb11
13	cm11	14	p2/m11	15	p2_{1}/m11	16	p2/b11	17	p2_{1}/b11
18	c2/m11								
Orthorhombic
19	p222	20	p2_{1}22	21	p2_{1}2_{1}2	22	c222	23	pmm2
24	pma2	25	pba2	26	cmm2	27	pm2m	28	pm2_{1}b
29	pb2_{1}m	30	pb2b	31	pm2a	32	pm2_{1}n	33	pb2_{1}a
34	pb2n	35	cm2m	36	cm2e	37	pmmm	38	pmaa
39	pban	40	pmam	41	pmma	42	pman	43	pbaa
44	pbam	45	pbma	46	pmmn	47	cmmm	48	cmme
Tetragonal
49	p4	50	p4̅	51	p4/m	52	p4/n	53	p422
54	p42_{1}2	55	p4mm	56	p4bm	57	p4̅2m	58	p4̅2_{1}m
59	p4̅m2	60	p4̅b2	61	p4/mmm	62	p4/nbm	63	p4/mbm
64	p4/nmm								
Trigonal
65	p3	66	p3̅	67	p312	68	p321	69	p3m1
70	p31m	71	p3̅1m	72	p3̅m1				
Hexagonal
73	p6	74	p6̅	75	p6/m	76	p622	77	p6mm
78	p6̅m2	79	p6̅2m	80	p6/mmm				

== Correspondence with plane groups ==
The surjective mapping from a layer group to a wallpaper group (plane group) can be obtained by disregarding symmetry elements along the stacking direction, typically denoted as the z-axis, and aligning the remaining elements with those of the plane groups. The resulting surjective mapping provides a direct correspondence between layer groups and plane groups (wallpaper groups).

Surjective mapping from Layer Groups to Plane Groups
#	Layer Group	#	Plane Group
1	p1	1	p1
2	p1̅	2	p2
3	p112	2	p2
4	p11m	1	p1
5	p11a	1	p1
6	p112/m	2	p2
7	p112/a	2	p2
8	p211	3	pm
9	p2_{1}11	4	pg
10	c211	5	cm
11	pm11	3	pm
12	pb11	4	pg
13	cm11	5	cm
14	p2/m11	6	p2mm
15	p2_{1}/m11	7	p2mg
16	p2/b11	7	p2mg
17	p2_{1}/b11	8	p2gg
18	c2/m11	9	c2mm
19	p222	6	p2mm
20	p2_{1}22	7	p2mg
21	p2_{1}2_{1}2	8	p2gg
22	c222	9	c2mm
23	pmm2	6	p2mm
24	pma2	7	p2mg
25	pba2	8	p2gg
26	cmm2	9	c2mm
27	pm2m	3	pm
28	pm2_{1}b	3	pm
29	pb2_{1}m	4	pg
30	pb2b	3	pm
31	pm2a	3	pm
32	pm2_{1}n	4	pg
33	pb2_{1}a	4	pg
34	pb2n	5	cm
35	cm2m	5	cm
36	cm2e	3	pm
37	pmmm	6	p2mm
38	pmaa	6	p2mm
39	pban	10	p4
40	pmam	7	p2mg
41	pmma	6	p2mm
42	pman	9	c2mm
43	pbaa	7	p2mg
44	pbam	8	p2gg
45	pbma	7	p2mg
46	pmmn	10	p4
47	cmmm	9	c2mm
48	cmme	6	p2mm
49	p4	10	p4
50	p4̅	10	p4
51	p4/m	10	p4
52	p4/n	12	p4gm
53	p422	11	p4mm
54	p42_{1}2	12	p4gm
55	p4mm	11	p4mm
56	p4bm	12	p4gm
57	p4̅2m	11	p4mm
58	p4̅2_{1}m	12	p4gm
59	p4̅m2	11	p4mm
60	p4̅b2	12	p4gm
61	p4/mmm	11	p4mm
62	p4/nbm	11	p4mm
63	p4/mbm	12	p4gm
64	p4/nmm	11	p4mm
65	p3	13	p3
66	p3̅	16	p6
67	p312	14	p3m1
68	p321	15	p31m
69	p3m1	14	p3m1
70	p31m	15	p31m
71	p3̅1m	17	p6mm
72	p3̅m1	17	p6mm
73	p6	16	p6
74	p6̅	13	p3
75	p6/m	16	p6
76	p622	17	p6mm
77	p6mm	17	p6mm
78	p6̅m2	14	p3m1
79	p6̅2m	15	p31m
80	p6/mmm	17	p6mm

== See also ==
- Point group
- Crystallographic point group
- Space group
- Rod group
- Frieze group
- Wallpaper group
