= Rod group =

In mathematics, a rod group is a three-dimensional line group whose point group is one of the axial crystallographic point groups. This constraint means that the point group must be the symmetry of some three-dimensional lattice.

Table of the 75 rod groups, organized by crystal system or lattice type, and by their point groups:

Triclinic
| 1 | p1 | 2 | p1̅ | | | | | | |
Monoclinic/inclined
| 3 | p211 | 4 | pm11 | 5 | pc11 | 6 | p2/m11 | 7 | p2/c11 |
Monoclinic/orthogonal
| 8 | p112 | 9 | p112_{1} | 10 | p11m | 11 | p112/m | 12 | p112_{1}/m |
Orthorhombic
| 13 | p222 | 14 | p222_{1} | 15 | pmm2 | 16 | pcc2 | 17 | pmc2_{1} |
| 18 | p2mm | 19 | p2cm | 20 | pmmm | 21 | pccm | 22 | pmcm |
Tetragonal
| 23 | p4 | 24 | p4_{1} | 25 | p4_{2} | 26 | p4_{3} | 27 | p4̅ |
| 28 | p4/m | 29 | p4_{2}/m | 30 | p422 | 31 | p4_{1}22 | 32 | p4_{2}22 |
| 33 | p4_{3}22 | 34 | p4mm | 35 | p4_{2}cm, p4_{2}mc | 36 | p4cc | 37 | p4̅2m, p4̅m2 |
| 38 | p4̅2c, p4̅c2 | 39 | p4/mmm | 40 | p4/mcc | 41 | p4_{2}/mmc, p4_{2}/mcm | | |
Trigonal
| 42 | p3 | 43 | p3_{1} | 44 | p3_{2} | 45 | p3̅ | 46 | p312, p321 |
| 47 | p3_{1}12, p3_{1}21 | 48 | p3_{2}12, p3_{2}21 | 49 | p3m1, p31m | 50 | p3c1, p31c | 51 | p3̅m1, p3̅1m |
| 52 | p3̅c1, p3̅1c | | | | | | | | |
Hexagonal
| 53 | p6 | 54 | p6_{1} | 55 | p6_{2} | 56 | p6_{3} | 57 | p6_{4} |
| 58 | p6_{5} | 59 | p6̅ | 60 | p6/m | 61 | p6_{3}/m | 62 | p622 |
| 63 | p6_{1}22 | 64 | p6_{2}22 | 65 | p6_{3}22 | 66 | p6_{4}22 | 67 | p6_{5}22 |
| 68 | p6mm | 69 | p6cc | 70 | p6_{3}mc, p6_{3}cm | 71 | p6̅m2, p6̅2m | 72 | p6̅c2, p6̅2c |
| 73 | p6/mmm | 74 | p6/mcc | 75 | p6_{3}/mmc, p6_{3}/mcm | | | | |

The double entries are for orientation variants of a group relative to the perpendicular-directions lattice.

Among these groups, there are 8 enantiomorphic pairs.

== See also ==
- Point group
- Crystallographic point group
- Space group
- Line group
- Frieze group
- Layer group
