= Glide reflection =

Geometric transformation combining reflection and translation

A glide reflection is the composition of a reflection across a line and a translation parallel to the line.

This footprint trail has glide-reflection symmetry. Applying the glide reflection maps each left footprint into a right footprint and vice versa.

In geometry, a glide reflection or transflection is a geometric transformation that consists of a reflection across a hyperplane and a translation ("glide") in a direction parallel to that hyperplane, combined into a single transformation.

Because the distances between points are not changed under glide reflection, it is a motion or isometry. When the context is the two-dimensional Euclidean plane, the hyperplane of reflection is a straight line called the glide line or glide axis. When the context is three-dimensional space, the hyperplane of reflection is a plane called the glide plane. The displacement vector of the translation is called the glide vector.

When some geometrical object or configuration appears unchanged by a transformation, it is said to have symmetry, and the transformation is called a symmetry operation. Glide-reflection symmetry is seen in frieze groups (patterns which repeat in one dimension, often used in decorative borders), wallpaper groups (regular tessellations of the plane), and space groups (which describe e.g. crystal symmetries). Objects with glide-reflection symmetry are in general not symmetrical under reflection alone, but two applications of the same glide reflection result in a double translation, so objects with glide-reflection symmetry always also have a simple translational symmetry.

When a reflection is composed with a translation in a direction perpendicular to the hyperplane of reflection, the composition of the two transformations is a reflection in a parallel hyperplane. However, when a reflection is composed with a translation in any other direction, the composition of the two transformations is a glide reflection, which can be uniquely described as a reflection in a parallel hyperplane composed with a translation in a direction parallel to the hyperplane.

A single glide is represented as frieze group p11g. A glide reflection can be seen as a limiting rotoreflection, where the rotation becomes a translation. It can also be given a Schoenflies notation as S_{2∞}, Coxeter notation as [∞^{+},2^{+}], and orbifold notation as ∞×.

== Frieze groups ==
In the Euclidean plane, reflections and glide reflections are the only two kinds of indirect (orientation-reversing) isometries.

For example, there is an isometry consisting of the reflection on the x-axis, followed by translation of one unit parallel to it. In coordinates, it takes

(x, y) → (x + 1, −y).

This isometry maps the x-axis to itself; any other line which is parallel to the x-axis gets reflected in the x-axis, so this system of parallel lines is left invariant.

The isometry group generated by just a glide reflection is an infinite cyclic group.

Combining two equal glide reflections gives a pure translation with a translation vector that is twice that of the glide reflection, so the even powers of the glide reflection form a translation group.

In the case of glide-reflection symmetry, the symmetry group of an object contains a glide reflection, and hence the group generated by it. If that is all it contains, this type is frieze group p11g.

Example pattern with this symmetry group:

A typical example of glide reflection in everyday life would be the track of footprints left in the sand by a person walking on a beach.

Frieze group nr. 6 (glide-reflections, translations and rotations) is generated by a glide reflection and a rotation about a point on the line of reflection. It is isomorphic to a semi-direct product of Z and C_{2}.

Example pattern with this symmetry group:

For any symmetry group containing some glide-reflection symmetry, the translation vector of any glide reflection is one half of an element of the translation group. If the translation vector of a glide reflection is itself an element of the translation group, then the corresponding glide-reflection symmetry reduces to a combination of reflection symmetry and translational symmetry.

== Wallpaper groups ==
Glide-reflection symmetry with respect to two parallel lines with the same translation implies that there is also translational symmetry in the direction perpendicular to these lines, with a translation distance which is twice the distance between glide reflection lines. This corresponds to wallpaper group pg; with additional symmetry it occurs also in pmg, pgg and p4g.

If there are also true reflection lines in the same direction then they are evenly spaced between the glide reflection lines. A glide reflection line parallel to a true reflection line already implies this situation. This corresponds to wallpaper group cm. The translational symmetry is given by oblique translation vectors from one point on a true reflection line to two points on the next, supporting a rhombus with the true reflection line as one of the diagonals. With additional symmetry it occurs also in cmm, p3m1, p31m, p4m and p6m.

In the Euclidean plane 3 of 17 wallpaper groups require glide reflection generators. p2gg has orthogonal glide reflections and 2-fold rotations. cm has parallel mirrors and glides, and pg has parallel glides. (Glide reflections are shown below as dashed lines)

Wallpaper group lattice domains, and fundamental domains (yellow)
Crystallographic name	pgg	cm	pg
Conway name	22×	*×	××
Diagram			
Example			

== Space groups ==
Glide planes are noted in the Hermann–Mauguin notation by a, b or c, depending on which axis the glide is along. (The orientation of the plane is determined by the position of the symbol in the Hermann–Mauguin designation.)

In this notation, an a-glide consists of reflection across a glide plane followed by a translation along the a or x-axis.

For example, for the a-glide:

(x, y, z) → (x + 1/2, −y, z).

Here,

y → −y

represents reflection across the xz-plane while

x→ x + 1/2

represents translation by half a unit-cell vector along the a-axis.

Similarly, a b-glide consists of reflection across a glide plane followed by a translation along the b or y-axis; and a c-glide consists of reflection across a glide plane followed by a translation along the c or z-axis. The letter therefore indicates the direction of the translational component of the glide.

C-glide plane in monoclinic zirconium dioxide (ZrO₂)

The shaded plane represents a c-glide plane parallel to the (010) plane, perpendicular to the y-direction. The glide plane is located at y = 1/4, corresponding to one quarter of the unit cell length along the y-axis. The c-glide operation consists of reflection across this plane, followed by a translation of half a unit cell vector along the z-direction.

A zirconium atom labeled Zr (A), initially at fractional coordinates $(x,y,z)$, is reflected across the plane, changing its y-coordinate to ($\frac{1}{2} -y$ ). It is then translated by $\frac{1}{2}$ along the z-axis, changing its z-coordinate to $(z+ \frac{1}{2})$ and resulting in the symmetry equivalent zirconium atom Zr (B).

The complete c-glide symmetry operation is:

$(x,y,z) \longrightarrow (x, \frac{1}{2} - y, z+ \frac{1}{2} )$

If the axis is not defined, then the glide plane may be noted by g. When the glide plane is parallel to the screen, these planes may be indicated by a bent arrow in which the arrowhead indicates the direction of the glide. When the glide plane is perpendicular to the screen, these planes can be represented either by dashed lines when the glide is parallel to the plane of the screen or dotted lines when the glide is perpendicular to the plane of the screen. Additionally, a centered lattice can cause a glide plane to exist in two directions at the same time. This type of glide plane may be indicated by a bent arrow with an arrowhead on both sides when the glide plan is parallel to the plane of the screen or a dashed and double-dotted line when the glide plane is perpendicular to the plane of the screen. There is also the n glide, which is a glide along the half of a diagonal of a face, and the d glide, which is along a fourth of either a face or space diagonal of the unit cell. The latter is often called the diamond glide plane as it features in the diamond structure.

The n glide plane may be indicated by diagonal arrow when it is parallel to the plane of the screen or a dashed-dotted line when the glide plane is perpendicular to the plane of the screen. A d glide plane may be indicated by a diagonal half-arrow if the glide plane is parallel to the plane of the screen or a dashed-dotted line with arrows if the glide plane is perpendicular to the plane of the screen. If a d glide plane is present in a crystal system, then that crystal must have a centered lattice.

In today's version of Hermann–Mauguin notation, the symbol e is used in cases where there are two possible ways of designating the glide direction because both are true. For example if a crystal has a base-centered Bravais lattice centered on the C face, then a glide of half a cell unit in the a direction gives the same result as a glide of half a cell unit in the b direction.

The isometry group generated by just a glide reflection is an infinite cyclic group. Combining two equal glide plane operations gives a pure translation with a translation vector that is twice that of the glide reflection, so the even powers of the glide reflection form a translation group.

In the case of glide-reflection symmetry, the symmetry group of an object contains a glide reflection and the group generated by it. For any symmetry group containing a glide reflection, the glide vector is one half of an element of the translation group. If the translation vector of a glide plane operation is itself an element of the translation group, then the corresponding glide plane symmetry reduces to a combination of reflection symmetry and translational symmetry.

== Examples and applications ==
Glide symmetry can be observed in nature among certain fossils of the Ediacara biota; the machaeridians; and certain palaeoscolecid worms. It can also be seen in many extant groups of sea pens.

In Conway's Game of Life, a commonly occurring pattern called the glider is so named because it repeats its configuration of cells, shifted by a glide reflection, after two steps of the automaton. After four steps and two glide reflections, the pattern returns to its original orientation, shifted diagonally by one unit. Continuing in this way, it moves across the array of the game.

In electrical engineering, if a signal that is periodic also has glide symmetries, it is said to be "half-wave symmetric". This extra symmetry causes the fourier series of the function to only contain odd terms. Examples include the sine function, square waves, and triangle waves.

== See also ==
- Screw axis
- Lattice (group)
