= Symmetry group =

Group of transformations under which the object is invariant

A regular tetrahedron is invariant under twelve distinct rotations (if the identity transformation is included as a trivial rotation and reflections are excluded). These are illustrated here in the cycle graph format, along with the 180° edge (blue arrows) and 120° vertex (pink and orange arrows) rotations that permute the tetrahedron through the positions. The twelve rotations form the rotation (symmetry) group of the figure.

In group theory, the symmetry group of a geometric object is the group of all transformations under which the object is invariant, endowed with the group operation of composition. Such a transformation is an invertible mapping of the ambient space which takes the object to itself, and which preserves all the relevant structure of the object. A frequent notation for the symmetry group of an object X is G = Sym(X).

For an object in a metric space, its symmetries form a subgroup of the isometry group of the ambient space. This article mainly considers symmetry groups in Euclidean geometry, but the concept may also be studied for more general types of geometric structure.

== Introduction ==
We consider the "objects" possessing symmetry to be geometric figures, images, and patterns, such as a wallpaper pattern. For symmetry of physical objects, one may also take their physical composition as part of the pattern. (A pattern may be specified formally as a scalar field, a function of position with values in a set of colors or substances; as a vector field; or as a more general function on the object.) The group of isometries of space induces a group action on objects in it, and the symmetry group Sym(X) consists of those isometries which map X to itself (as well as mapping any further pattern to itself). We say X is invariant under such a mapping, and the mapping is a symmetry of X.

The above is sometimes called the full symmetry group of X to emphasize that it includes orientation-reversing isometries (reflections, glide reflections and improper rotations), as long as those isometries map this particular X to itself. The subgroup of orientation-preserving symmetries (translations, rotations, and compositions of these) is called its proper symmetry group. An object is chiral when it has no orientation-reversing symmetries, so that its proper symmetry group is equal to its full symmetry group.

Any symmetry group whose elements have a common fixed point, which is true if the group is finite or the figure is bounded, can be represented as a subgroup of the orthogonal group O(n) by choosing the origin to be a fixed point. The proper symmetry group is then a subgroup of the special orthogonal group SO(n), and is called the rotation group of the figure.

In a discrete symmetry group, the points symmetric to a given point do not accumulate toward a limit point. That is, every orbit of the group (the images of a given point under all group elements) forms a discrete set. All finite symmetry groups are discrete.

Discrete symmetry groups come in three types: (1) finite point groups, which include only rotations, reflections, inversions and rotoinversions – i.e., the finite subgroups of O(n); (2) infinite lattice groups, which include only translations; and (3) infinite space groups containing elements of both previous types, and perhaps also extra transformations like screw displacements and glide reflections. There are also continuous symmetry groups (Lie groups), which contain rotations of arbitrarily small angles or translations of arbitrarily small distances. An example is O(3), the symmetry group of a sphere. Symmetry groups of Euclidean objects may be completely classified as the subgroups of the Euclidean group E(n) (the isometry group of R^{n}).

Two geometric figures have the same symmetry type when their symmetry groups are conjugate subgroups of the Euclidean group: that is, when the subgroups H_{1}, H_{2} are related by H_{1} = g^{−1}H_{2}g for some g in E(n). For example:

- two 3D figures have mirror symmetry, but with respect to different mirror planes.
- two 3D figures have 3-fold rotational symmetry, but with respect to different axes.
- two 2D patterns have translational symmetry, each in one direction; the two translation vectors have the same length but a different direction.

In the following sections, we only consider isometry groups whose orbits are topologically closed, including all discrete and continuous isometry groups. However, this excludes for example the 1D group of translations by a rational number; such a non-closed figure cannot be drawn with reasonable accuracy due to its arbitrarily fine detail.

== One dimension ==
The isometry groups in one dimension are:

- the trivial cyclic group C_{1}
- the groups of two elements generated by a reflection; they are isomorphic with C_{2}
- the infinite discrete groups generated by a translation; they are isomorphic with Z, the additive group of the integers
- the infinite discrete groups generated by a translation and a reflection; they are isomorphic with the generalized dihedral group of Z, Dih(Z), also denoted by D_{∞} (which is a semidirect product of Z and C_{2}).
- the group generated by all translations (isomorphic with the additive group of the real numbers R); this group cannot be the symmetry group of a Euclidean figure, even endowed with a pattern: such a pattern would be homogeneous, hence could also be reflected. However, a constant one-dimensional vector field has this symmetry group.
- the group generated by all translations and reflections in points; they are isomorphic with the generalized dihedral group Dih(R).

== Two dimensions ==
Up to conjugacy the discrete point groups in two-dimensional space are the following classes:

- cyclic groups C_{1}, C_{2}, C_{3}, C_{4}, ... where C_{n} consists of all rotations about a fixed point by multiples of the angle 360°/n
- dihedral groups D_{1}, D_{2}, D_{3}, D_{4}, ..., where D_{n} (of order 2n) consists of the rotations in C_{n} together with reflections in n axes that pass through the fixed point.

C_{1} is the trivial group containing only the identity operation, which occurs when the figure is asymmetric, for example the letter "F". C_{2} is the symmetry group of the letter "Z", C_{3} that of a triskelion, C_{4} that of a chiral four-bladed pinwheel, and C_{5}, C_{6}, etc. are the symmetry groups of similar chiral pinwheels with five, six, etc. arms.

D_{1} is the 2-element group containing the identity operation and a single reflection, which occurs when the figure has only a single axis of bilateral symmetry, for example the letter "A".

D_{2}, which is isomorphic to the Klein four-group, is the symmetry group of a non-equilateral rectangle. This figure has four symmetry operations: the identity operation, one twofold axis of rotation, and two nonequivalent mirror planes.

D_{3}, D_{4} etc. are the symmetry groups of the regular polygons.

Within each of these symmetry types, there are two degrees of freedom for the center of rotation, and in the case of the dihedral groups, one more for the positions of the mirrors.

The remaining isometry groups in two dimensions with a fixed point are:

- the special orthogonal group SO(2) consisting of all rotations about a fixed point; it is also called the circle group S^{1}, the multiplicative group of complex numbers of absolute value 1. It is the proper symmetry group of a circle and the continuous equivalent of C_{n}. There is no geometric figure that has as full symmetry group the circle group, but for a vector field it may apply (see the three-dimensional case below).
- the orthogonal group O(2) consisting of all rotations about a fixed point and reflections in any axis through that fixed point. This is the symmetry group of a circle. It is also called Dih(S^{1}) as it is the generalized dihedral group of S^{1}.

Non-bounded figures may have isometry groups including translations; these are:

- the 7 frieze groups
- the 17 wallpaper groups
- for each of the symmetry groups in one dimension, the combination of all symmetries in that group in one direction, and the group of all translations in the perpendicular direction
- ditto with also reflections in a line in the first direction.

== Three dimensions ==
Up to conjugacy the set of three-dimensional point groups consists of 7 infinite series, and 7 other individual groups. In crystallography, only those point groups are considered which preserve some crystal lattice (so their rotations may only have order 1, 2, 3, 4, or 6). This crystallographic restriction of the infinite families of general point groups results in 32 crystallographic point groups (27 individual groups from the 7 series, and 5 of the 7 other individuals). The symmetry operations within these crystallographic point groups can be systematically broken down into smaller, closed mathematical sets known as subgroups.

The continuous symmetry groups with a fixed point include those of:

- cylindrical symmetry without a symmetry plane perpendicular to the axis. This applies, for example, to a bottle or cone.
- cylindrical symmetry with a symmetry plane perpendicular to the axis
- spherical symmetry

For objects with scalar field patterns, the cylindrical symmetry implies vertical reflection symmetry as well. However, this is not true for vector field patterns: for example, in cylindrical coordinates with respect to some axis, the vector field $\mathbf{A} = A_\rho\boldsymbol{\hat \rho} + A_\phi\boldsymbol{\hat \phi} + A_z\boldsymbol{\hat z}$ has cylindrical symmetry with respect to the axis whenever $A_\rho, A_\phi,$ and $A_z$ have this symmetry (no dependence on $\phi$); and it has reflectional symmetry only when $A_\phi = 0$.

For spherical symmetry, there is no such distinction: any patterned object has planes of reflection symmetry.

The continuous symmetry groups without a fixed point include those with a screw axis, such as an infinite helix. See also subgroups of the Euclidean group.

== Symmetry groups in general ==
In wider contexts, a symmetry group may be any kind of transformation group, or automorphism group. Each type of mathematical structure has invertible mappings which preserve the structure. Conversely, specifying the symmetry group can define the structure, or at least clarify the meaning of geometric congruence or invariance; this is one way of looking at the Erlangen programme.

For example, objects in a hyperbolic non-Euclidean geometry have Fuchsian symmetry groups, which are the discrete subgroups of the isometry group of the hyperbolic plane, preserving hyperbolic rather than Euclidean distance. (Some are depicted in drawings of Escher.) Similarly, automorphism groups of finite geometries preserve families of point-sets (discrete subspaces) rather than Euclidean subspaces, distances, or inner products. Just as for Euclidean figures, objects in any geometric space have symmetry groups which are subgroups of the symmetries of the ambient space.

Another example of a symmetry group is that of a combinatorial graph: a graph symmetry is a permutation of the vertices which takes edges to edges. Any finitely presented group is the symmetry group of its Cayley graph; the free group is the symmetry group of an infinite tree graph.

== Group structure in terms of symmetries ==
Cayley's theorem states that any abstract group is a subgroup of the permutations of some set X, and so can be considered as the symmetry group of X with some extra structure. In addition, many abstract features of the group (defined purely in terms of the group operation) can be interpreted in terms of symmetries.

For example, let G = Sym(X) be the finite symmetry group of a figure X in a Euclidean space, and let H ⊂ G be a subgroup. Then H can be interpreted as the symmetry group of X^{+}, a "decorated" version of X. Such a decoration may be constructed as follows. Add some patterns such as arrows or colors to X so as to break all symmetry, obtaining a figure X^{#} with Sym(X^{#}) = {1}, the trivial subgroup; that is, gX^{#} ≠ X^{#} for all non-trivial g ∈ G. Now we get:

$$X^+ \ = \ \bigcup_{h\in H} hX^{\#} \quad\text{satisfies}\quad
H = \mathrm{Sym}(X^+).$$

Normal subgroups may also be characterized in this framework. The symmetry group of the translation gX ^{+} is the conjugate subgroup gHg^{−1}. Thus H is normal whenever:

$$\mathrm{Sym}(gX^+) = \mathrm{Sym}(X^+) \ \ \text{for all} \ g\in G;$$

that is, whenever the decoration of X^{+} may be drawn in any orientation, with respect to any side or feature of X, and still yield the same symmetry group gHg^{−1} = H.

As an example, consider the dihedral group G = D_{3} = Sym(X), where X is an equilateral triangle. We may decorate this with an arrow on one edge, obtaining an asymmetric figure X^{#}. Letting τ ∈ G be the reflection of the arrowed edge, the composite figure X^{+} = X^{#} ∪ τX^{#} has a bidirectional arrow on that edge, and its symmetry group is H = {1, τ}. This subgroup is not normal, since gX^{+} may have the bi-arrow on a different edge, giving a different reflection symmetry group.

However, letting H = {1, ρ, ρ^{2}} ⊂ D_{3} be the cyclic subgroup generated by a rotation, the decorated figure X^{+} consists of a 3-cycle of arrows with consistent orientation. Then H is normal, since drawing such a cycle with either orientation yields the same symmetry group H.

== See also ==
- Crystal system
- Euclidean plane isometry
- Fixed points of isometry groups in Euclidean space
- Molecular symmetry
- Permutation group
- Symmetric group
- Symmetry in quantum mechanics
