= Frieze group =

Type of symmetry group

Examples of frieze patterns

In mathematics, a frieze or frieze pattern is a two-dimensional design that repeats in one direction. The term is derived from friezes in architecture and decorative arts, where such repeating patterns are often used. Frieze patterns can be classified into seven types according to their symmetries. The set of symmetries of a frieze pattern is called a frieze group.

Frieze groups are two-dimensional line groups, having repetition in only one direction. They are related to the more complex wallpaper groups, which classify patterns that are repetitive in two directions, and crystallographic groups, which classify patterns that are repetitive in three directions.

== History ==
Mathematical friezes have their origins in the formulas for the pentagramma mirificum found by Carl Friedrich Gauss in 1843 and Harold Scott MacDonald Coxeter's study of symmetries in the mid-20th century. Frieze patterns were formally introduced by Coxeter in 1971. In the 1970s to 1980s, frieze patterns were the subject of mathematical works by Coxeter, John Horton Conway, Geoffrey Colin Shephard, Pierre Gabriel, and others in combinatorics and the theory of quiver representations.

In the 21st century, new relations were found between frieze patterns and cluster algebras, Grassmannians, linear difference equations, moduli spaces of points in projective spaces, and transfer matrices in solvable lattice models.

== Definition ==
The seven frieze groups
1. p1: T (translation only, in the horizontal direction)
2. p1m1: TV (translation and vertical line reflection)
3. p11m: THG (translation, horizontal line reflection, and glide reflection)
4. p11g: TG (translation and glide reflection)
5. p2: TR (translation and 180° rotation)
6. p2mg: TRVG (translation, 180° rotation, vertical line reflection, and glide reflection)
7. p2mm: TRHVG (translation, 180° rotation, horizontal line reflection, vertical line reflection, and glide reflection)

Formally, a frieze group is a class of infinite discrete symmetry groups of patterns on a strip (infinitely wide rectangle), hence a class of groups of isometries of the plane, or of a strip. A symmetry group of a frieze group necessarily contains translations and may contain glide reflections, reflections along the long axis of the strip, reflections along the narrow axis of the strip, and 180° rotations. There are seven frieze groups, listed in the summary table. Many authors present the frieze groups in a different order.

== Symmetry groups and generators ==
The actual symmetry groups within a frieze group are characterized by the smallest translation distance, and, for the frieze groups with vertical line reflection or 180° rotation (groups 2, 5, 6, and 7), by a shift parameter locating the reflection axis or point of rotation. In the case of symmetry groups in the plane, additional parameters are the direction of the translation vector, and, for the frieze groups with horizontal line reflection, glide reflection, or 180° rotation (groups 3–7), the position of the reflection axis or rotation point in the direction perpendicular to the translation vector. Thus there are two degrees of freedom for group 1, three for groups 2, 3, and 4, and four for groups 5, 6, and 7.

For two of the seven frieze groups (groups 1 and 4) the symmetry groups are singly generated, for four (groups 2, 3, 5, and 6) they have a pair of generators, and for group 7 the symmetry groups require three generators. A symmetry group in frieze group 1, 2, 3, or 5 is a subgroup of a symmetry group in the last frieze group with the same translational distance. A symmetry group in frieze group 4 or 6 is a subgroup of a symmetry group in the last frieze group with half the translational distance. This last frieze group contains the symmetry groups of the simplest periodic patterns in the strip (or the plane), a row of dots. Any transformation of the plane leaving this pattern invariant can be decomposed into a translation, (x, y) ↦ (n + x, y), optionally followed by a reflection in either the horizontal axis, (x, y) ↦ (x, −y), or the vertical axis, (x, y) ↦ (−x, y), provided that this axis is chosen through or midway between two dots, or a rotation by 180°, (x, y) ↦ (−x, −y) (ditto). Therefore, in a way, this frieze group contains the "largest" symmetry groups, which consist of all such transformations.

The inclusion of the discrete condition is to exclude the group containing all translations, and groups containing arbitrarily small translations (e.g. the group of horizontal translations by rational distances). Even apart from scaling and shifting, there are infinitely many cases, e.g. by considering rational numbers of which the denominators are powers of a given prime number.

The inclusion of the infinite condition is to exclude groups that have no translations:

- the group with the identity only (isomorphic to C_{1}, the trivial group of order 1).
- the group consisting of the identity and reflection in the horizontal axis (isomorphic to C_{2}, the cyclic group of order 2).
- the groups each consisting of the identity and reflection in a vertical axis (ditto)
- the groups each consisting of the identity and 180° rotation about a point on the horizontal axis (ditto)
- the groups each consisting of the identity, reflection in a vertical axis, reflection in the horizontal axis, and 180° rotation about the point of intersection (isomorphic to the Klein four-group)

== Descriptions of the seven frieze groups ==
There are seven distinct subgroups (up to scaling and shifting of patterns) in the discrete frieze group (called TRHVG) generated by a translation, reflection (along the same axis) and a 180° rotation. Each of these subgroups is the symmetry group of a frieze pattern, and sample patterns are shown in the table further down. The seven different groups correspond to the 7 infinite series of axial point groups in three dimensions, but with n equal, as it were, to infinity. (Think of a dome with a frieze going around its base. It will belong to one of the point groups, with n being the number of repeats as one goes all the way around the dome. The frieze groups are similar, but translations go on infinitely without coming back to the starting point.)

It is easy to see why there are seven groups. Regarding reflexions and glides on the axis of the frieze, there are three possibilities: there may be glides (G), glides and a reflexion (H), or neither. Regarding reflexions on "vertical" lines (V), there are two possibilities: having them or not. This gives six groups:

	No glide	Glides only	Glides and reflexion around horizontal axis
No reflexion around vertical lines	T (C_{∞})	TG (S_{∞})	THG (C_{∞h})
Presence of reflexions around vertical lines	TV (C_{∞v})	TRVG (D_{∞d})	TRHVG (D_{∞h})

When both V and glides are present, then there are two-fold rotations R. But R can exist by itself, giving the seventh group, TR (D_{∞}).

The groups are identified in the table below using Hermann–Mauguin notation, Coxeter notation, Schönflies notation, orbifold notation, nicknames created by mathematician John H. Conway, and finally a description in terms of translation, reflections and rotations.

Frieze groups
IUC	Cox.	Schön.^{*}	Orbifold	Diagram^{§}	Examples and Conway nickname	Description
p1	[∞]^{+}	C_{∞} Z_{∞}	∞∞		hop	(T) Translations only: This group is singly generated, by a translation by the smallest distance over which the pattern is periodic.
p11g	[∞^{+},2^{+}]	S_{∞} Z_{∞}	∞×		step	(TG) Glide-reflections and Translations: This group is singly generated, by a glide reflection, with translations being obtained by combining two glide reflections.
p1m1	[∞]	C_{∞v} Dih_{∞}	*∞∞		sidle	(TV) Vertical reflection lines and Translations: The group is the same as the non-trivial group in the one-dimensional case; it is generated by a translation and a reflection in the vertical axis.
p2	[∞,2]^{+}	D_{∞} Dih_{∞}	22∞		spinning hop	(TR) Translations and 180° Rotations: The group is generated by a translation and a 180° rotation.
p2mg	[∞,2^{+}]	D_{∞d} Dih_{∞}	2*∞		spinning sidle	(TRVG) Vertical reflection lines, Glide reflections, Translations and 180° Rotations: The translations here arise from the glide reflections, so this group is generated by a glide reflection and either a rotation or a vertical reflection.
p11m	[∞^{+},2]	C_{∞h} Z_{∞}×Dih_{1}	∞*		jump	(THG) Translations, Horizontal reflections, Glide reflections: This group is generated by a translation and the reflection in the horizontal axis. The glide reflection here arises as the composition of translation and horizontal reflection
p2mm	[∞,2]	D_{∞h} Dih_{∞}×Dih_{1}	*22∞		spinning jump	(TRHVG) Horizontal and Vertical reflection lines, Translations and 180° Rotations: This group requires three generators, with one generating set consisting of a translation, the reflection in the horizontal axis and a reflection across a vertical axis.

^{*}Schönflies's point group notation is extended here as infinite cases of the equivalent dihedral points symmetries
^{§}The diagram shows one fundamental domain in yellow, with reflection lines in blue, glide reflection lines in dashed green, translation normals in red, and 2-fold gyration points as small green squares.

Of the seven frieze groups, there are only four up to isomorphism. Two are singly generated and isomorphic to $\mathbb{Z}$; four of them are doubly generated, among which one is abelian and three are nonabelian and isomorphic to $D_\infty$, the infinite dihedral group; and one of them has three generators.

=== Lattice types: Oblique and rectangular ===
The groups can be classified by their type of two-dimensional grid or lattice. The lattice being oblique means that the second direction need not be orthogonal to the direction of repeat.

Lattice type	Groups
Oblique	p1, p2
Rectangular	p1m1, p11m, p11g, p2mm, p2mg

== See also ==
- Symmetry groups in one dimension
- Line group
- Rod group
- Wallpaper group
- Space group

== Web demo and software ==
There exist software graphic tools that create 2D patterns using frieze groups. Usually, the entire pattern is updated automatically in response to edits of the original strip.

- EscherSketch A free online program for drawing, saving, and exporting tessellations. Supports all wallpaper groups.
- Kali, a free and open source software application for wallpaper, frieze and other patterns.
- Kali, free downloadable Kali for Windows and Mac Classic.
- Tess, a nagware tessellation program for multiple platforms, supports all wallpaper, frieze, and rosette groups, as well as Heesch tilings.
- FriezingWorkz, a freeware Hypercard stack for the Classic Mac platform that supports all frieze groups.
