= Point group =

Group of geometric symmetries with at least one fixed point

The Bauhinia blakeana flower on the Hong Kong region flag has C_{5} symmetry; the star on each petal has D_{5} symmetry.	The Yin and Yang symbol has C_{2} symmetry of geometry with inverted colors

In geometry, a point group is a mathematical group of symmetry operations (isometries in a Euclidean space) that have a fixed point in common. The coordinate origin of the Euclidean space is conventionally taken to be a fixed point, and every point group in dimension d is then a subgroup of the orthogonal group O(d). Point groups are used to describe the symmetries of geometric figures and physical objects such as molecules.

Each point group can be represented as sets of orthogonal matrices M that transform point x into point y according to y = Mx. Each element of a point group is either a rotation (determinant of M = 1), or it is a reflection or improper rotation (determinant of M = −1).

The geometric symmetries of crystals are described by space groups, which allow translations and contain point groups as subgroups. Discrete point groups in more than one dimension come in infinite families, but from the crystallographic restriction theorem and one of Bieberbach's theorems, each number of dimensions has only a finite number of point groups that are symmetric over some lattice or grid with that number of dimensions. These are the crystallographic point groups.

== Chiral and achiral point groups, reflection groups ==
Point groups can be classified into chiral (or purely rotational) and achiral groups. The chiral groups are subgroups of the special orthogonal group SO(d): they contain only orientation-preserving orthogonal transformations, i.e., those of determinant +1. The achiral groups contain also transformations of determinant −1. In an achiral group, the orientation-preserving transformations form a (chiral) subgroup of index 2.

Finite Coxeter groups or reflection groups are those point groups that are generated purely by a set of reflectional mirrors passing through the same point. A rank n Coxeter group has n mirrors and is represented by a Coxeter–Dynkin diagram. Coxeter notation offers a bracketed notation equivalent to the Coxeter diagram, with markup symbols for rotational and other subsymmetry point groups. Reflection groups are necessarily achiral (except for the trivial group containing only the identity element).

== List of point groups ==
=== One dimension ===
There are only two one-dimensional point groups, the identity group and the reflection group.

Group	Coxeter	Coxeter diagram	Order	Description
C_{1}	[ ]^{+}		1	identity
D_{1}	[ ]		2	reflection group

=== Two dimensions ===
Point groups in two dimensions, sometimes called rosette groups.

They come in two infinite families:

1. Cyclic groups C_{n} of n-fold rotation groups
2. Dihedral groups D_{n} of n-fold rotation and reflection groups

Applying the crystallographic restriction theorem restricts n to values 1, 2, 3, 4, and 6 for both families, yielding 10 groups.

Group	Intl	Orbifold	Coxeter	Order	Description
C_{n}	n	n•	[n]^{+}	n	cyclic: n-fold rotations; abstract group Z_{n}, the group of integers under addition modulo n
D_{n}	nm	*n•	[n]	2n	dihedral: cyclic with reflections; abstract group Dih_{n}, the dihedral group

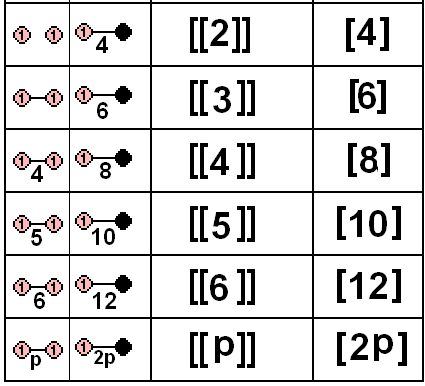
Finite isomorphism and correspondences

The subset of pure reflectional point groups, defined by 1 or 2 mirrors, can also be given by their Coxeter group and related polygons. These include 5 crystallographic groups. The symmetry of the reflectional groups can be doubled by an isomorphism, mapping both mirrors onto each other by a bisecting mirror, doubling the symmetry order.

Reflective					Rotational			Related polygons
Group	Coxeter group		Coxeter diagram	Order	Subgroup	Coxeter	Order	Related polygons
D_{1}	A_{1}	[ ]		2	C_{1}	[]^{+}	1	digon
D_{2}	A_{1}^{2}	[2]		4	C_{2}	[2]^{+}	2	rectangle
D_{3}	A_{2}	[3]		6	C_{3}	[3]^{+}	3	equilateral triangle
D_{4}	BC_{2}	[4]		8	C_{4}	[4]^{+}	4	square
D_{5}	H_{2}	[5]		10	C_{5}	[5]^{+}	5	regular pentagon
D_{6}	G_{2}	[6]		12	C_{6}	[6]^{+}	6	regular hexagon
D_{n}	I_{2}(n)	[n]		2n	C_{n}	[n]^{+}	n	regular polygon
D_{2}×2	A_{1}^{2}×2	[[2]] = [4]	=	8				
D_{3}×2	A_{2}×2	[[3]] = [6]	=	12				
D_{4}×2	BC_{2}×2	[[4]] = [8]	=	16				
D_{5}×2	H_{2}×2	[[5]] = [10]	=	20				
D_{6}×2	G_{2}×2	[[6]] = [12]	=	24				
D_{n}×2	I_{2}(n)×2	[[n]] = [2n]	=	4n				

=== Three dimensions ===
Point groups in three dimensions are sometimes called molecular point groups after their wide use in studying symmetries of molecules.

They come in 7 infinite families of axial groups (also called prismatic), and 7 additional polyhedral groups (also called Platonic). In Schoenflies notation,

- Axial groups: C_{n}, S_{2n}, C_{nh}, C_{nv}, D_{n}, D_{nd}, D_{nh}
- Polyhedral groups: T, T_{d}, T_{h}, O, O_{h}, I, I_{h}

Applying the crystallographic restriction theorem to these groups yields the 32 crystallographic point groups.

Even/odd colored fundamental domains of the reflective groups
C_{1v} Order 2	C_{2v} Order 4	C_{3v} Order 6	C_{4v} Order 8	C_{5v} Order 10	C_{6v} Order 12	...
D_{1h} Order 4	D_{2h} Order 8	D_{3h} Order 12	D_{4h} Order 16	D_{5h} Order 20	D_{6h} Order 24	...
T_{d} Order 24	O_{h} Order 48	I_{h} Order 120				

Intl^{*}	Geo (Note: The Crystallographic Space groups in Geometric algebra, D. Hestenes and J. Holt, Journal of Mathematical Physics. 48, 023514 (2007) (22 pages))	Orbifold	Schoenflies	Coxeter	Order
1	1̅	1	C_{1}	[ ]^{+}	1
1̅	2̅2̅	×1	C_{i} = S_{2}	[2^{+},2^{+}]	2
2̅ = m	1	*1	C_{s} = C_{1v} = C_{1h}	[ ]	2
2; 3; 4; 5; 6 n	2̅; 3̅; 4̅; 5̅; 6̅ n̅	22; 33; 44; 55; 66 nn	C_{2} C_{3} C_{4} C_{5} C_{6} C_{n}	[2]^{+} [3]^{+} [4]^{+} [5]^{+} [6]^{+} [n]^{+}	2; 3; 4; 5; 6 n
mm2 3m 4mm 5m 6mm nmm nm	2; 3; 4; 5; 6 n	*22; *33; *44; *55; *66 *nn	C_{2v} C_{3v} C_{4v} C_{5v} C_{6v} C_{nv}	[2] [3] [4] [5] [6] [n]	4; 6; 8; 10; 12; 2n
2/m 6̅; 4/m 1̅0̅; 6/m n/m 2̅n̅	2̅ 2; 3̅ 2; 4̅ 2; 5̅ 2; 6̅ 2 n̅ 2	2*; 3*; 4*; 5*; 6* n*	C_{2h} C_{3h} C_{4h} C_{5h} C_{6h} C_{nh}	[2,2^{+}] [2,3^{+}] [2,4^{+}] [2,5^{+}] [2,6^{+}] [2,n^{+}]	4; 6; 8; 10; 12; 2n
4̅; 3̅; 8̅; 5̅; 1̅2̅; 2̅n̅ n̅	4̅ 2̅; 6̅ 2̅; 8̅ 2̅; 1̅0̅ 2̅; 1̅2̅ 2̅; 2̅n̅ 2̅	2× 3× 4× 5× 6× n×	S_{4} S_{6} S_{8} S_{10} S_{12} S_{2n}	[2^{+},4^{+}] [2^{+},6^{+}] [2^{+},8^{+}] [2^{+},10^{+}] [2^{+},12^{+}] [2^{+},2n^{+}]	4; 6; 8; 10; 12; 2n

Intl	Geo	Orbifold	Schoenflies	Coxeter	Order
222; 32; 422; 52; 622 n22 n2	2̅ 2̅; 3̅ 2̅; 4̅ 2̅; 5̅ 2̅; 6̅ 2̅ n̅ 2̅	222; 223; 224; 225; 226; 22n	D_{2} D_{3} D_{4} D_{5} D_{6} D_{n}	[2,2]^{+} [2,3]^{+} [2,4]^{+} [2,5]^{+} [2,6]^{+} [2,n]^{+}	4; 6; 8; 10; 12; 2n
mmm 6̅m2 4/mmm 1̅0̅m2 6/mmm n/mmm 2̅n̅m2	2 2; 3 2; 4 2; 5 2; 6 2 n 2	*222; *223; *224; *225; *226; *22n	D_{2h} D_{3h} D_{4h} D_{5h} D_{6h} D_{nh}	[2,2] [2,3] [2,4] [2,5] [2,6] [2,n]	8; 12; 16; 20; 24; 4n
4̅2m 3̅m 8̅2m 5̅m 1̅2̅2m 2̅n̅2m n̅m	4 2̅; 6 2̅; 8 2̅; 10 2̅; 12 2̅ n 2̅	2*2; 2*3; 2*4; 2*5; 2*6; 2*n	D_{2d} D_{3d} D_{4d} D_{5d} D_{6d} D_{nd}	[2^{+},4] [2^{+},6] [2^{+},8] [2^{+},10] [2^{+},12] [2^{+},2n]	8; 12; 16; 20; 24; 4n
23	3̅ 3̅	332	T	[3,3]^{+}	12
m3̅	4 3̅	3*2	T_{h}	[3^{+},4]	24
4̅3m	3 3	*332	T_{d}	[3,3]	24
432	4̅ 3̅	432	O	[3,4]^{+}	24
m3̅m	4 3	*432	O_{h}	[3,4]	48
532	5̅ 3̅	532	I	[3,5]^{+}	60
5̅3̅m	5 3	*532	I_{h}	[3,5]	120

(*) When the Intl entries are duplicated, the first is for even n, the second for odd n.

==== Reflection groups ====
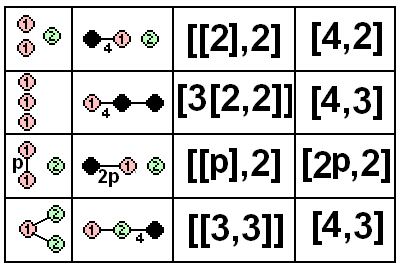
Finite isomorphism and correspondences

The reflection point groups, defined by 1 to 3 mirror planes, can also be given by their Coxeter group and related polyhedra. The [3,3] group can be doubled, written as [[3,3]], mapping the first and last mirrors onto each other, doubling the symmetry to 48, and isomorphic to the [4,3] group.

Schoenflies	Coxeter group		Coxeter diagram	Order	Related regular and prismatic polyhedra
T_{d}	A_{3}	[3,3]		24	tetrahedron
T_{d}×Dih_{1} = O_{h}	A_{3}×2 = BC_{3}	[[3,3]] = [4,3]	=	48	stellated octahedron
O_{h}	BC_{3}	[4,3]		48	cube, octahedron
I_{h}	H_{3}	[5,3]		120	icosahedron, dodecahedron
D_{3h}	A_{2}×A_{1}	[3,2]		12	triangular prism
D_{3h}×Dih_{1} = D_{6h}	A_{2}×A_{1}×2	[[3],2]	=	24	hexagonal prism
D_{4h}	BC_{2}×A_{1}	[4,2]		16	square prism
D_{4h}×Dih_{1} = D_{8h}	BC_{2}×A_{1}×2	[[4],2] = [8,2]	=	32	octagonal prism
D_{5h}	H_{2}×A_{1}	[5,2]		20	pentagonal prism
D_{6h}	G_{2}×A_{1}	[6,2]		24	hexagonal prism
D_{nh}	I_{2}(n)×A_{1}	[n,2]		4n	n-gonal prism
D_{nh}×Dih_{1} = D_{2nh}	I_{2}(n)×A_{1}×2	[[n],2]	=	8n	
D_{2h}	A_{1}^{3}	[2,2]		8	cuboid
D_{2h}×Dih_{1}	A_{1}^{3}×2	[[2],2] = [4,2]	=	16	cuboid
D_{2h}×Dih_{3} = O_{h}	A_{1}^{3}×6	[3[2,2]] = [4,3]	=	48	cuboid
C_{3v}	A_{2}	[1,3]		6	hosohedron
C_{4v}	BC_{2}	[1,4]		8	hosohedron
C_{5v}	H_{2}	[1,5]		10	hosohedron
C_{6v}	G_{2}	[1,6]		12	hosohedron
C_{nv}	I_{2}(n)	[1,n]		2n	hosohedron
C_{nv}×Dih_{1} = C_{2nv}	I_{2}(n)×2	[1,[n]] = [1,2n]	=	4n	hosohedron
C_{2v}	A_{1}^{2}	[1,2]		4	hosohedron
C_{2v}×Dih_{1}	A_{1}^{2}×2	[1,[2]]	=	8	hosohedron
C_{s}	A_{1}	[1,1]		2	hosohedron

=== Four dimensions ===
The four-dimensional point groups (chiral as well as achiral) are listed in Conway and Smith, Section 4, Tables 4.1–4.3.

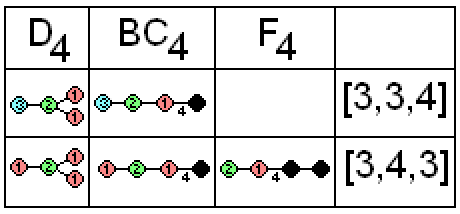
Finite isomorphism and correspondences

The following list gives the four-dimensional reflection groups (excluding those that leave a subspace fixed and that are therefore lower-dimensional reflection groups). Each group is specified as a Coxeter group, and like the polyhedral groups of 3D, it can be named by its related convex regular 4-polytope. Related pure rotational groups exist for each with half the order, and can be represented by the bracket Coxeter notation with a '+' exponent, for example [3,3,3]^{+} has three 3-fold gyration points and symmetry order 60. Front-back symmetric groups like [3,3,3] and [3,4,3] can be doubled, shown as double brackets in Coxeter's notation, for example [[3,3,3]] with its order doubled to 240.

Coxeter group/notation		Coxeter diagram	Order	Related polytopes
A_{4}	[3,3,3]		120	5-cell
A_{4}×2	[[3,3,3]]		240	5-cell dual compound
BC_{4}	[4,3,3]		384	16-cell / tesseract
D_{4}	[3^{1,1,1}]		192	demitesseractic
D_{4}×2 = BC_{4}	<[3,3^{1,1}]> = [4,3,3]	=	384	demitesseractic
D_{4}×6 = F_{4}	[3[3^{1,1,1}]] = [3,4,3]	=	1152	demitesseractic
F_{4}	[3,4,3]		1152	24-cell
F_{4}×2	[[3,4,3]]		2304	24-cell dual compound
H_{4}	[5,3,3]		14400	120-cell / 600-cell
A_{3}×A_{1}	[3,3,2]		48	tetrahedral prism
A_{3}×A_{1}×2	[[3,3],2] = [4,3,2]	=	96	octahedral prism
BC_{3}×A_{1}	[4,3,2]		96	octahedral prism
H_{3}×A_{1}	[5,3,2]		240	icosahedral prism
A_{2}×A_{2}	[3,2,3]		36	duoprism
A_{2}×BC_{2}	[3,2,4]		48	duoprism
A_{2}×H_{2}	[3,2,5]		60	duoprism
A_{2}×G_{2}	[3,2,6]		72	duoprism
BC_{2}×BC_{2}	[4,2,4]		64	duoprism
BC_{2}^{2}×2	[[4,2,4]]		128	duoprism
BC_{2}×H_{2}	[4,2,5]		80	duoprism
BC_{2}×G_{2}	[4,2,6]		96	duoprism
H_{2}×H_{2}	[5,2,5]		100	duoprism
H_{2}×G_{2}	[5,2,6]		120	duoprism
G_{2}×G_{2}	[6,2,6]		144	duoprism
I_{2}(p)×I_{2}(q)	[p,2,q]		4pq	duoprism
I_{2}(2p)×I_{2}(q)	[[p],2,q] = [2p,2,q]	=	8pq	duoprism
I_{2}(2p)×I_{2}(2q)	[[p]],2,[[q]] = [2p,2,2q]	=	16pq	duoprism
I_{2}(p)^{2}×2	[[p,2,p]]		8p^{2}	duoprism
I_{2}(2p)^{2}×2	[[[p]],2,[p]]] = [[2p,2,2p]]	=	32p^{2}	duoprism
A_{2}×A_{1}×A_{1}	[3,2,2]		24	duoprism
BC_{2}×A_{1}×A_{1}	[4,2,2]		32	duoprism
H_{2}×A_{1}×A_{1}	[5,2,2]		40	duoprism
G_{2}×A_{1}×A_{1}	[6,2,2]		48	duoprism
I_{2}(p)×A_{1}×A_{1}	[p,2,2]		8p	duoprism
I_{2}(2p)×A_{1}×A_{1}×2	[[p],2,2] = [2p,2,2]	=	16p	duoprism
I_{2}(p)×A_{1}^{2}×2	[p,2,[2]] = [p,2,4]	=	16p	duoprism
I_{2}(2p)×A_{1}^{2}×4	[[p]],2,[[2]] = [2p,2,4]	=	32p	duoprism
A_{1}×A_{1}×A_{1}×A_{1}	[2,2,2]		16	4-orthotope
A_{1}^{2}×A_{1}×A_{1}×2	[[2],2,2] = [4,2,2]	=	32	4-orthotope
A_{1}^{2}×A_{1}^{2}×4	[[2]],2,[[2]] = [4,2,4]	=	64	4-orthotope
A_{1}^{3}×A_{1}×6	[3[2,2],2] = [4,3,2]	=	96	4-orthotope
A_{1}^{4}×24	[3,3[2,2,2]] = [4,3,3]	=	384	4-orthotope

=== Five dimensions ===
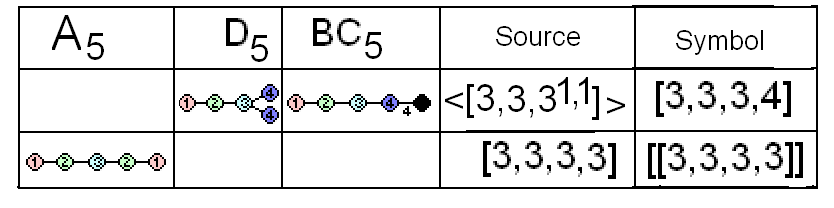
Finite isomorphism and correspondences

The following table gives the five-dimensional reflection groups (excluding those that are lower-dimensional reflection groups), by listing them as Coxeter groups. Related chiral groups exist for each with half the order, and can be represented by the bracket Coxeter notation with a '+' exponent, for example [3,3,3,3]^{+} has four 3-fold gyration points and symmetry order 360.

Coxeter group/notation		Coxeter diagrams		Order	Related regular and prismatic polytopes
A_{5}	[3,3,3,3]			720	5-simplex
A_{5}×2	[[3,3,3,3]]			1440	5-simplex dual compound
BC_{5}	[4,3,3,3]			3840	5-cube, 5-orthoplex
D_{5}	[3^{2,1,1}]			1920	5-demicube
D_{5}×2	<[3,3,3^{1,1}]>		=	3840	
A_{4}×A_{1}	[3,3,3,2]			240	5-cell prism
A_{4}×A_{1}×2	[[3,3,3],2]			480	
BC_{4}×A_{1}	[4,3,3,2]			768	tesseract prism
F_{4}×A_{1}	[3,4,3,2]			2304	24-cell prism
F_{4}×A_{1}×2	[[3,4,3],2]			4608	24-cell prism
H_{4}×A_{1}	[5,3,3,2]			28800	600-cell or 120-cell prism
D_{4}×A_{1}	[3^{1,1,1},2]			384	demitesseract prism
A_{3}×A_{2}	[3,3,2,3]			144	duoprism
A_{3}×A_{2}×2	[[3,3],2,3]||		288		duoprism
A_{3}×BC_{2}	[3,3,2,4]			192	duoprism
A_{3}×H_{2}	[3,3,2,5]			240	duoprism
A_{3}×G_{2}	[3,3,2,6]			288	duoprism
A_{3}×I_{2}(p)	[3,3,2,p]			48p	duoprism
BC_{3}×A_{2}	[4,3,2,3]			288	duoprism
BC_{3}×BC_{2}	[4,3,2,4]			384	duoprism
BC_{3}×H_{2}	[4,3,2,5]			480	duoprism
BC_{3}×G_{2}	[4,3,2,6]			576	duoprism
BC_{3}×I_{2}(p)	[4,3,2,p]			96p	duoprism
H_{3}×A_{2}	[5,3,2,3]			720	duoprism
H_{3}×BC_{2}	[5,3,2,4]			960	duoprism
H_{3}×H_{2}	[5,3,2,5]			1200	duoprism
H_{3}×G_{2}	[5,3,2,6]			1440	duoprism
H_{3}×I_{2}(p)	[5,3,2,p]			240p	duoprism
A_{3}×A_{1}^{2}	[3,3,2,2]			96	duoprism
BC_{3}×A_{1}^{2}	[4,3,2,2]			192	duoprism
H_{3}×A_{1}^{2}	[5,3,2,2]			480	duoprism
A_{2}^{2}×A_{1}	[3,2,3,2]			72	duoprism prism
A_{2}×BC_{2}×A_{1}	[3,2,4,2]			96	duoprism prism
A_{2}×H_{2}×A_{1}	[3,2,5,2]			120	duoprism prism
A_{2}×G_{2}×A_{1}	[3,2,6,2]			144	duoprism prism
BC_{2}^{2}×A_{1}	[4,2,4,2]			128	duoprism prism
BC_{2}×H_{2}×A_{1}	[4,2,5,2]			160	duoprism prism
BC_{2}×G_{2}×A_{1}	[4,2,6,2]			192	duoprism prism
H_{2}^{2}×A_{1}	[5,2,5,2]			200	duoprism prism
H_{2}×G_{2}×A_{1}	[5,2,6,2]			240	duoprism prism
G_{2}^{2}×A_{1}	[6,2,6,2]			288	duoprism prism
I_{2}(p)×I_{2}(q)×A_{1}	[p,2,q,2]			8pq	duoprism prism
A_{2}×A_{1}^{3}	[3,2,2,2]			48	duoprism prism
BC_{2}×A_{1}^{3}	[4,2,2,2]			64	duoprism prism
H_{2}×A_{1}^{3}	[5,2,2,2]			80	duoprism prism
G_{2}×A_{1}^{3}	[6,2,2,2]			96	duoprism prism
I_{2}(p)×A_{1}^{3}	[p,2,2,2]			16p	duoprism prism
A_{1}^{5}	[2,2,2,2]			32	5-orthotope
A_{1}^{5}×(2!)	[[2],2,2,2]||	=	64		5-orthotope
A_{1}^{5}×(2!×2!)	[[2]],2,[2],2]		=	128	5-orthotope
A_{1}^{5}×(3!)	[3[2,2],2,2]		=	192	5-orthotope
A_{1}^{5}×(3!×2!)	[3[2,2],2,[[2]]		=	384	5-orthotope
A_{1}^{5}×(4!)	[3,3[2,2,2],2]]		=	768	5-orthotope
A_{1}^{5}×(5!)	[3,3,3[2,2,2,2]]		=	3840	5-orthotope

=== Six dimensions ===
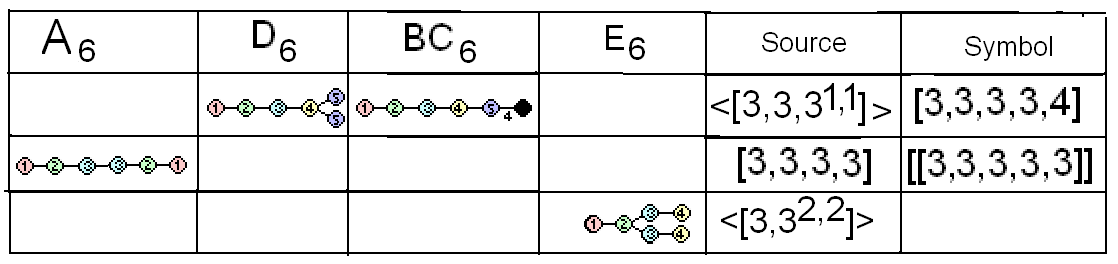
Finite isomorphism and correspondences

The following table gives the six-dimensional reflection groups (excluding those that are lower-dimensional reflection groups), by listing them as Coxeter groups. Related pure rotational groups exist for each with half the order, and can be represented by the bracket Coxeter notation with a '+' exponent, for example [3,3,3,3,3]^{+} has five 3-fold gyration points and symmetry order 2520.

Coxeter group		Coxeter diagram	Order	Related regular and prismatic polytopes
A_{6}	[3,3,3,3,3]		5040 (7!)	6-simplex
A_{6}×2	[[3,3,3,3,3]]		10080 (2×7!)	6-simplex dual compound
BC_{6}	[4,3,3,3,3]		46080 (2^{6}×6!)	6-cube, 6-orthoplex
D_{6}	[3,3,3,3^{1,1}]		23040 (2^{5}×6!)	6-demicube
E_{6}	[3,3^{2,2}]		51840 (72×6!)	1_{22}, 2_{21}
A_{5}×A_{1}	[3,3,3,3,2]		1440 (2×6!)	5-simplex prism
BC_{5}×A_{1}	[4,3,3,3,2]		7680 (2^{6}×5!)	5-cube prism
D_{5}×A_{1}	[3,3,3^{1,1},2]		3840 (2^{5}×5!)	5-demicube prism
A_{4}×I_{2}(p)	[3,3,3,2,p]		240p	duoprism
BC_{4}×I_{2}(p)	[4,3,3,2,p]		768p	duoprism
F_{4}×I_{2}(p)	[3,4,3,2,p]		2304p	duoprism
H_{4}×I_{2}(p)	[5,3,3,2,p]		28800p	duoprism
D_{4}×I_{2}(p)	[3,3^{1,1},2,p]		384p	duoprism
A_{4}×A_{1}^{2}	[3,3,3,2,2]		480	duoprism
BC_{4}×A_{1}^{2}	[4,3,3,2,2]		1536	duoprism
F_{4}×A_{1}^{2}	[3,4,3,2,2]		4608	duoprism
H_{4}×A_{1}^{2}	[5,3,3,2,2]		57600	duoprism
D_{4}×A_{1}^{2}	[3,3^{1,1},2,2]		768	duoprism
A_{3}^{2}	[3,3,2,3,3]		576	duoprism
A_{3}×BC_{3}	[3,3,2,4,3]		1152	duoprism
A_{3}×H_{3}	[3,3,2,5,3]		2880	duoprism
BC_{3}^{2}	[4,3,2,4,3]		2304	duoprism
BC_{3}×H_{3}	[4,3,2,5,3]		5760	duoprism
H_{3}^{2}	[5,3,2,5,3]		14400	duoprism
A_{3}×I_{2}(p)×A_{1}	[3,3,2,p,2]		96p	duoprism prism
BC_{3}×I_{2}(p)×A_{1}	[4,3,2,p,2]		192p	duoprism prism
H_{3}×I_{2}(p)×A_{1}	[5,3,2,p,2]		480p	duoprism prism
A_{3}×A_{1}^{3}	[3,3,2,2,2]		192	duoprism prism
BC_{3}×A_{1}^{3}	[4,3,2,2,2]		384	duoprism prism
H_{3}×A_{1}^{3}	[5,3,2,2,2]		960	duoprism prism
I_{2}(p)×I_{2}(q)×I_{2}(r)	[p,2,q,2,r]		8pqr	triaprism
I_{2}(p)×I_{2}(q)×A_{1}^{2}	[p,2,q,2,2]		16pq	triaprism
I_{2}(p)×A_{1}^{4}	[p,2,2,2,2]		32p	triaprism
A_{1}^{6}	[2,2,2,2,2]		64	6-orthotope

=== Seven dimensions ===
The following table gives the seven-dimensional reflection groups (excluding those that are lower-dimensional reflection groups), by listing them as Coxeter groups. Related chiral groups exist for each with half the order, defined by an even number of reflections, and can be represented by the bracket Coxeter notation with a '+' exponent, for example [3,3,3,3,3,3]^{+} has six 3-fold gyration points and symmetry order 20160.

Coxeter group		Coxeter diagram	Order	Related polytopes
A_{7}	[3,3,3,3,3,3]		40320 (8!)	7-simplex
A_{7}×2	[[3,3,3,3,3,3]]		80640 (2×8!)	7-simplex dual compound
BC_{7}	[4,3,3,3,3,3]		645120 (2^{7}×7!)	7-cube, 7-orthoplex
D_{7}	[3,3,3,3,3^{1,1}]		322560 (2^{6}×7!)	7-demicube
E_{7}	[3,3,3,3^{2,1}]		2903040 (8×9!)	3_{21}, 2_{31}, 1_{32}
A_{6}×A_{1}	[3,3,3,3,3,2]		10080 (2×7!)	
BC_{6}×A_{1}	[4,3,3,3,3,2]		92160 (2^{7}×6!)	
D_{6}×A_{1}	[3,3,3,3^{1,1},2]		46080 (2^{6}×6!)	
E_{6}×A_{1}	[3,3,3^{2,1},2]		103680 (144×6!)	
A_{5}×I_{2}(p)	[3,3,3,3,2,p]		1440p	
BC_{5}×I_{2}(p)	[4,3,3,3,2,p]		7680p	
D_{5}×I_{2}(p)	[3,3,3^{1,1},2,p]		3840p	
A_{5}×A_{1}^{2}	[3,3,3,3,2,2]		2880	
BC_{5}×A_{1}^{2}	[4,3,3,3,2,2]		15360	
D_{5}×A_{1}^{2}	[3,3,3^{1,1},2,2]		7680	
A_{4}×A_{3}	[3,3,3,2,3,3]		2880	
A_{4}×BC_{3}	[3,3,3,2,4,3]		5760	
A_{4}×H_{3}	[3,3,3,2,5,3]		14400	
BC_{4}×A_{3}	[4,3,3,2,3,3]		9216	
BC_{4}×BC_{3}	[4,3,3,2,4,3]		18432	
BC_{4}×H_{3}	[4,3,3,2,5,3]		46080	
H_{4}×A_{3}	[5,3,3,2,3,3]		345600	
H_{4}×BC_{3}	[5,3,3,2,4,3]		691200	
H_{4}×H_{3}	[5,3,3,2,5,3]		1728000	
F_{4}×A_{3}	[3,4,3,2,3,3]		27648	
F_{4}×BC_{3}	[3,4,3,2,4,3]		55296	
F_{4}×H_{3}	[3,4,3,2,5,3]		138240	
D_{4}×A_{3}	[3^{1,1,1},2,3,3]		4608	
D_{4}×BC_{3}	[3,3^{1,1},2,4,3]		9216	
D_{4}×H_{3}	[3,3^{1,1},2,5,3]		23040	
A_{4}×I_{2}(p)×A_{1}	[3,3,3,2,p,2]		480p	
BC_{4}×I_{2}(p)×A_{1}	[4,3,3,2,p,2]		1536p	
D_{4}×I_{2}(p)×A_{1}	[3,3^{1,1},2,p,2]		768p	
F_{4}×I_{2}(p)×A_{1}	[3,4,3,2,p,2]		4608p	
H_{4}×I_{2}(p)×A_{1}	[5,3,3,2,p,2]		57600p	
A_{4}×A_{1}^{3}	[3,3,3,2,2,2]		960	
BC_{4}×A_{1}^{3}	[4,3,3,2,2,2]		3072	
F_{4}×A_{1}^{3}	[3,4,3,2,2,2]		9216	
H_{4}×A_{1}^{3}	[5,3,3,2,2,2]		115200	
D_{4}×A_{1}^{3}	[3,3^{1,1},2,2,2]		1536	
A_{3}^{2}×A_{1}	[3,3,2,3,3,2]		1152	
A_{3}×BC_{3}×A_{1}	[3,3,2,4,3,2]		2304	
A_{3}×H_{3}×A_{1}	[3,3,2,5,3,2]		5760	
BC_{3}^{2}×A_{1}	[4,3,2,4,3,2]		4608	
BC_{3}×H_{3}×A_{1}	[4,3,2,5,3,2]		11520	
H_{3}^{2}×A_{1}	[5,3,2,5,3,2]		28800	
A_{3}×I_{2}(p)×I_{2}(q)	[3,3,2,p,2,q]		96pq	
BC_{3}×I_{2}(p)×I_{2}(q)	[4,3,2,p,2,q]		192pq	
H_{3}×I_{2}(p)×I_{2}(q)	[5,3,2,p,2,q]		480pq	
A_{3}×I_{2}(p)×A_{1}^{2}	[3,3,2,p,2,2]		192p	
BC_{3}×I_{2}(p)×A_{1}^{2}	[4,3,2,p,2,2]		384p	
H_{3}×I_{2}(p)×A_{1}^{2}	[5,3,2,p,2,2]		960p	
A_{3}×A_{1}^{4}	[3,3,2,2,2,2]		384	
BC_{3}×A_{1}^{4}	[4,3,2,2,2,2]		768	
H_{3}×A_{1}^{4}	[5,3,2,2,2,2]		1920	
I_{2}(p)×I_{2}(q)×I_{2}(r)×A_{1}	[p,2,q,2,r,2]		16pqr	
I_{2}(p)×I_{2}(q)×A_{1}^{3}	[p,2,q,2,2,2]		32pq	
I_{2}(p)×A_{1}^{5}	[p,2,2,2,2,2]		64p	
A_{1}^{7}	[2,2,2,2,2,2]		128	

=== Eight dimensions ===
The following table gives the eight-dimensional reflection groups (excluding those that are lower-dimensional reflection groups), by listing them as Coxeter groups. Related chiral groups exist for each with half the order, defined by an even number of reflections, and can be represented by the bracket Coxeter notation with a '+' exponent, for example [3,3,3,3,3,3,3]^{+} has seven 3-fold gyration points and symmetry order 181440.

Coxeter group		Coxeter diagram	Order	Related polytopes
A_{8}	[3,3,3,3,3,3,3]		362880 (9!)	8-simplex
A_{8}×2	[[3,3,3,3,3,3,3]]		725760 (2×9!)	8-simplex dual compound
BC_{8}	[4,3,3,3,3,3,3]		10321920 (2^{8}8!)	8-cube, 8-orthoplex
D_{8}	[3,3,3,3,3,3^{1,1}]		5160960 (2^{7}8!)	8-demicube
E_{8}	[3,3,3,3,3^{2,1}]		696729600 (192×10!)	4_{21}, 2_{41}, 1_{42}
A_{7}×A_{1}	[3,3,3,3,3,3,2]		80640	7-simplex prism
BC_{7}×A_{1}	[4,3,3,3,3,3,2]		645120	7-cube prism
D_{7}×A_{1}	[3,3,3,3,3^{1,1},2]		322560	7-demicube prism
E_{7}×A_{1}	[3,3,3,3^{2,1},2]		5806080	3_{21} prism, 2_{31} prism, 1_{42} prism
A_{6}×I_{2}(p)	[3,3,3,3,3,2,p]		10080p	duoprism
BC_{6}×I_{2}(p)	[4,3,3,3,3,2,p]		92160p	duoprism
D_{6}×I_{2}(p)	[3,3,3,3^{1,1},2,p]		46080p	duoprism
E_{6}×I_{2}(p)	[3,3,3^{2,1},2,p]		103680p	duoprism
A_{6}×A_{1}^{2}	[3,3,3,3,3,2,2]		20160	duoprism
BC_{6}×A_{1}^{2}	[4,3,3,3,3,2,2]		184320	duoprism
D_{6}×A_{1}^{2}	[3^{3,1,1},2,2]		92160	duoprism
E_{6}×A_{1}^{2}	[3,3,3^{2,1},2,2]		207360	duoprism
A_{5}×A_{3}	[3,3,3,3,2,3,3]		17280	duoprism
BC_{5}×A_{3}	[4,3,3,3,2,3,3]		92160	duoprism
D_{5}×A_{3}	[3^{2,1,1},2,3,3]		46080	duoprism
A_{5}×BC_{3}	[3,3,3,3,2,4,3]		34560	duoprism
BC_{5}×BC_{3}	[4,3,3,3,2,4,3]		184320	duoprism
D_{5}×BC_{3}	[3^{2,1,1},2,4,3]		92160	duoprism
A_{5}×H_{3}	[3,3,3,3,2,5,3]			duoprism
BC_{5}×H_{3}	[4,3,3,3,2,5,3]			duoprism
D_{5}×H_{3}	[3^{2,1,1},2,5,3]			duoprism
A_{5}×I_{2}(p)×A_{1}	[3,3,3,3,2,p,2]			duoprism
BC_{5}×I_{2}(p)×A_{1}	[4,3,3,3,2,p,2]			duoprism
D_{5}×I_{2}(p)×A_{1}	[3^{2,1,1},2,p,2]			duoprism
A_{5}×A_{1}^{3}	[3,3,3,3,2,2,2]			duoprism
BC_{5}×A_{1}^{3}	[4,3,3,3,2,2,2]			duoprism
D_{5}×A_{1}^{3}	[3^{2,1,1},2,2,2]			duoprism
A_{4}×A_{4}	[3,3,3,2,3,3,3]			duoprism
BC_{4}×A_{4}	[4,3,3,2,3,3,3]			duoprism
D_{4}×A_{4}	[3^{1,1,1},2,3,3,3]			duoprism
F_{4}×A_{4}	[3,4,3,2,3,3,3]			duoprism
H_{4}×A_{4}	[5,3,3,2,3,3,3]			duoprism
BC_{4}×BC_{4}	[4,3,3,2,4,3,3]			duoprism
D_{4}×BC_{4}	[3^{1,1,1},2,4,3,3]			duoprism
F_{4}×BC_{4}	[3,4,3,2,4,3,3]			duoprism
H_{4}×BC_{4}	[5,3,3,2,4,3,3]			duoprism
D_{4}×D_{4}	[3^{1,1,1},2,3^{1,1,1}]			duoprism
F_{4}×D_{4}	[3,4,3,2,3^{1,1,1}]			duoprism
H_{4}×D_{4}	[5,3,3,2,3^{1,1,1}]			duoprism
F_{4}×F_{4}	[3,4,3,2,3,4,3]			duoprism
H_{4}×F_{4}	[5,3,3,2,3,4,3]			duoprism
H_{4}×H_{4}	[5,3,3,2,5,3,3]			duoprism
A_{4}×A_{3}×A_{1}	[3,3,3,2,3,3,2]			duoprism prisms
A_{4}×BC_{3}×A_{1}	[3,3,3,2,4,3,2]			duoprism prisms
A_{4}×H_{3}×A_{1}	[3,3,3,2,5,3,2]			duoprism prisms
BC_{4}×A_{3}×A_{1}	[4,3,3,2,3,3,2]			duoprism prisms
BC_{4}×BC_{3}×A_{1}	[4,3,3,2,4,3,2]			duoprism prisms
BC_{4}×H_{3}×A_{1}	[4,3,3,2,5,3,2]			duoprism prisms
H_{4}×A_{3}×A_{1}	[5,3,3,2,3,3,2]			duoprism prisms
H_{4}×BC_{3}×A_{1}	[5,3,3,2,4,3,2]			duoprism prisms
H_{4}×H_{3}×A_{1}	[5,3,3,2,5,3,2]			duoprism prisms
F_{4}×A_{3}×A_{1}	[3,4,3,2,3,3,2]			duoprism prisms
F_{4}×BC_{3}×A_{1}	[3,4,3,2,4,3,2]			duoprism prisms
F_{4}×H_{3}×A_{1}	[3,4,2,3,5,3,2]			duoprism prisms
D_{4}×A_{3}×A_{1}	[3^{1,1,1},2,3,3,2]			duoprism prisms
D_{4}×BC_{3}×A_{1}	[3^{1,1,1},2,4,3,2]			duoprism prisms
D_{4}×H_{3}×A_{1}	[3^{1,1,1},2,5,3,2]			duoprism prisms
A_{4}×I_{2}(p)×I_{2}(q)	[3,3,3,2,p,2,q]			triaprism
BC_{4}×I_{2}(p)×I_{2}(q)	[4,3,3,2,p,2,q]			triaprism
F_{4}×I_{2}(p)×I_{2}(q)	[3,4,3,2,p,2,q]			triaprism
H_{4}×I_{2}(p)×I_{2}(q)	[5,3,3,2,p,2,q]			triaprism
D_{4}×I_{2}(p)×I_{2}(q)	[3^{1,1,1},2,p,2,q]			triaprism
A_{4}×I_{2}(p)×A_{1}^{2}	[3,3,3,2,p,2,2]			
BC_{4}×I_{2}(p)×A_{1}^{2}	[4,3,3,2,p,2,2]			
F_{4}×I_{2}(p)×A_{1}^{2}	[3,4,3,2,p,2,2]			
H_{4}×I_{2}(p)×A_{1}^{2}	[5,3,3,2,p,2,2]			
D_{4}×I_{2}(p)×A_{1}^{2}	[3^{1,1,1},2,p,2,2]			
A_{4}×A_{1}^{4}	[3,3,3,2,2,2,2]			
BC_{4}×A_{1}^{4}	[4,3,3,2,2,2,2]			
F_{4}×A_{1}^{4}	[3,4,3,2,2,2,2]			
H_{4}×A_{1}^{4}	[5,3,3,2,2,2,2]			
D_{4}×A_{1}^{4}	[3^{1,1,1},2,2,2,2]			
A_{3}×A_{3}×I_{2}(p)	[3,3,2,3,3,2,p]			
BC_{3}×A_{3}×I_{2}(p)	[4,3,2,3,3,2,p]			
H_{3}×A_{3}×I_{2}(p)	[5,3,2,3,3,2,p]			
BC_{3}×BC_{3}×I_{2}(p)	[4,3,2,4,3,2,p]			
H_{3}×BC_{3}×I_{2}(p)	[5,3,2,4,3,2,p]			
H_{3}×H_{3}×I_{2}(p)	[5,3,2,5,3,2,p]			
A_{3}×A_{3}×A_{1}^{2}	[3,3,2,3,3,2,2]			
BC_{3}×A_{3}×A_{1}^{2}	[4,3,2,3,3,2,2]			
H_{3}×A_{3}×A_{1}^{2}	[5,3,2,3,3,2,2]			
BC_{3}×BC_{3}×A_{1}^{2}	[4,3,2,4,3,2,2]			
H_{3}×BC_{3}×A_{1}^{2}	[5,3,2,4,3,2,2]			
H_{3}×H_{3}×A_{1}^{2}	[5,3,2,5,3,2,2]			
A_{3}×I_{2}(p)×I_{2}(q)×A_{1}	[3,3,2,p,2,q,2]			
BC_{3}×I_{2}(p)×I_{2}(q)×A_{1}	[4,3,2,p,2,q,2]			
H_{3}×I_{2}(p)×I_{2}(q)×A_{1}	[5,3,2,p,2,q,2]			
A_{3}×I_{2}(p)×A_{1}^{3}	[3,3,2,p,2,2,2]			
BC_{3}×I_{2}(p)×A_{1}^{3}	[4,3,2,p,2,2,2]			
H_{3}×I_{2}(p)×A_{1}^{3}	[5,3,2,p,2,2,2]			
A_{3}×A_{1}^{5}	[3,3,2,2,2,2,2]			
BC_{3}×A_{1}^{5}	[4,3,2,2,2,2,2]			
H_{3}×A_{1}^{5}	[5,3,2,2,2,2,2]			
I_{2}(p)×I_{2}(q)×I_{2}(r)×I_{2}(s)	[p,2,q,2,r,2,s]		16pqrs	
I_{2}(p)×I_{2}(q)×I_{2}(r)×A_{1}^{2}	[p,2,q,2,r,2,2]		32pqr	
I_{2}(p)×I_{2}(q)×A_{1}^{4}	[p,2,q,2,2,2,2]		64pq	
I_{2}(p)×A_{1}^{6}	[p,2,2,2,2,2,2]		128p	
A_{1}^{8}	[2,2,2,2,2,2,2]		256	

== See also ==
- Bravais lattice
- Crystallographic point group
- Crystallography
- Infrared spectroscopy of metal carbonyls
- Molecular symmetry
- Point groups in two dimensions
- Point groups in three dimensions
- Point groups in four dimensions
- Space group
- X-ray diffraction
