= Point groups in three dimensions =

Groups of point isometries in 3 dimensions

Selected point groups in three dimensions
Involutional symmetry C_{s}, (*) [ ] =	Cyclic symmetry C_{nv}, (*nn) [n] =	Dihedral symmetry D_{nh}, (*n22) [n,2] =
Polyhedral group, [n,3], (*n32)
Tetrahedral symmetry T_{d}, (*332) [3,3] =	Octahedral symmetry O_{h}, (*432) [4,3] =	Icosahedral symmetry I_{h}, (*532) [5,3] =

In geometry, a point group in three dimensions is a group of Euclidean isometries that leave at least one point fixed. By convention, this common fixed point is chosen as the origin; this is no loss of generality, since the coordinate system can always be translated accordingly. For point groups in other dimensions, see point group.

Every Euclidean isometry that fixes the origin is a linear transformation preserving the Euclidean distance, and can therefore be represented by an orthogonal matrix. Consequently, every three-dimensional point group is a subgroup of the orthogonal group O(3), the group of all orthogonal transformations of three-dimensional Euclidean space. A point group typically describes the symmetry group of a geometric figure or physical object, such as a polyhedron, molecule or crystal. For an object S, its point group is its group of symmetries:

$$G_S = \{A \in O(3) \mid A(S)=S\}.$$

Point groups may be finite or infinite. The finite point groups are of particular importance in crystallography and chemistry. In crystallography, the crystallographic restriction limits the possible rotational symmetries of a periodic crystal lattice, resulting in the 32 crystallographic point groups, which are grouped into seven crystal systems. Combined with lattice translations, they give rise to the 230 space groups. In chemistry, point groups describe the symmetries of molecules and of molecular orbitals forming covalent bonds; in this context they are also called molecular point groups.

The point groups that are generated purely by reflections in a finite set of mirror planes passing through a common point are the finite Coxeter groups, represented by Coxeter notation.

== Symmetry operations ==
The symmetry group operations (symmetry operations) are the isometries of three-dimensional space R^{3} that leave the origin fixed, forming the group O(3). These operations can be categorized as:

- The direct (orientation-preserving) symmetry operations, which form the group SO(3):
  - The identity operation, denoted by E or the identity matrix I.
  - Rotation about an axis through the origin by an angle θ. Rotation by θ = 360°/n for any positive integer n is denoted C_{n} (from the Schoenflies notation for the group C_{n} that it generates). The identity operation, also written C_{1}, is a special case of the rotation operator.
- The indirect (orientation-reversing) operations:
  - Inversion, denoted i or C_{i}, that is, rotation by 180° about a coordinate axis followed by a reflection in the orthogonal coordinate plane. The matrix notation is −I.
  - Reflection in a plane through the origin, denoted σ.
  - Improper rotation, also called rotation-reflection: rotation about an axis by an angle θ, combined with reflection in the plane through the origin perpendicular to the axis. Rotation-reflection by θ = 360°/n for any positive integer n is denoted S_{n} (from the Schoenflies notation for the group S_{n} that it generates if n is even).

Inversion is a special case of rotation-reflection (i = S_{2}), as is reflection (σ = S_{1}), so these operations are often classified as improper rotations.

A circumflex is sometimes added to the symbol to indicate an operator, as in Ĉ_{n} and Ŝ_{n}.

== Conjugacy ==
When comparing the symmetry type of two objects, the origin is chosen for each separately, i.e., they need not have the same center. Moreover, two objects are considered to be of the same symmetry type if their symmetry groups are conjugate subgroups of O(3) (two subgroups H_{1}, H_{2} of a group G are conjugate, if there exists g ∈ G such that H_{1} = g^{−1}H_{2}g ).

For example, two 3D objects have the same symmetry type:

- if both have mirror symmetry, but with respect to a different mirror plane
- if both have 3-fold rotational symmetry, but with respect to a different axis.

In the case of multiple mirror planes and/or axes of rotation, two symmetry groups are of the same symmetry type if and only if there is a rotation mapping the whole structure of the first symmetry group to that of the second. Conjugation by an improper isometry yields nothing new: since the inversion −I commutes with every element of O(3), conjugating by −R is the same as conjugating by the rotation R.

== Classification ==
Symmetries in 3D that leave the origin fixed are fully characterized by symmetries on a sphere centered at the origin. For finite 3D point groups, see also spherical symmetry groups.

Up to conjugacy, the finite 3D point groups are:

- § Axial groups, which have at most one more-than-2-fold rotation axis; they are the finite symmetry groups on an infinite cylinder, or equivalently, those on a finite cylinder. They are sometimes called the axial or prismatic point groups.
- § Polyhedral groups, which have multiple rotation axes of order 3 or higher; in fact, they always have multiple 3-fold axes. The possible combinations are:
  - Four 3-fold axes (the three tetrahedral symmetries T, T_{h}, and T_{d})
  - Four 3-fold axes and three 4-fold axes (octahedral symmetries O and O_{h})
  - Ten 3-fold axes and six 5-fold axes (icosahedral symmetries I and I_{h})

According to the crystallographic restriction theorem, only a limited number of point groups are compatible with discrete translational symmetry: 27 from the 7 infinite series, and 5 of the 7 others. Together, these make up the 32 so-called crystallographic point groups.

The infinite point groups are discussed in § Continuous groups; the topologically closed ones among them are the seven Curie limiting groups, which are limits of the finite groups.

== Axial groups ==
The infinite series of axial or prismatic groups have an index n, which can be any positive integer; in each series, the nth symmetry group contains n-fold rotational symmetry about an axis, i.e., symmetry with respect to a rotation by an angle 360°/n. n=1 covers the cases of no rotational symmetry at all. There are four series with no other axes of rotational symmetry (see cyclic symmetries) and three with additional axes of 2-fold symmetry (see dihedral symmetry). They can be understood as point groups in two dimensions extended with an axial coordinate and reflections in it. They are related to the frieze groups; they can be interpreted as frieze-group patterns repeated n times around a cylinder.

The following table lists several notations for point groups: Hermann–Mauguin notation (used in crystallography), Schönflies notation (used to describe molecular symmetry), orbifold notation, and Coxeter notation. The latter three are not only conveniently related to its properties, but also to the order of the group. The orbifold notation is a unified notation, also applicable for wallpaper groups and frieze groups. The crystallographic groups have n restricted to 1, 2, 3, 4, and 6; removing crystallographic restriction allows any positive integer. The series are:

Intl		Schoenflies	Orbifold	Coxeter	Frieze	Struct.	Order	Generators	Example	Comments
Even n	Odd n	Schoenflies	Orbifold	Coxeter	(cylinder)	Struct.	Order	Generators	Example	Comments
n		C_{n}	nn	[n]^{+}	p1	Z_{n}	n	C_{n}		n-fold rotational symmetry
2̅n̅	n̅	S_{2n}	n×	[2n^{+},2^{+}]	p11g	Z_{2n}	2n	C_{2n}σ_{h}		2n-fold rotoreflection symmetry
n/m	2̅n̅	C_{nh}	n*	[n^{+},2]	p11m	Z_{n}×Z_{2}	2n	C_{n}, σ_{h}		
nmm	nm	C_{nv}	*nn	[n]	p1m1	Dih_{n}	2n	C_{n}, σ_{v}		Pyramidal symmetry; in biology, biradial symmetry
n22	n2	D_{n}	22n	[n,2]^{+}	p211	Dih_{n}	2n	C_{n}, U		Dihedral symmetry
2̅n̅2m	n̅m	D_{nd}	2*n	[2n,2^{+}]	p2mg	Dih_{2n}	4n	C_{2n}σ_{h}, σ_{v}		Antiprismatic symmetry
n/mmm	2̅n̅2m	D_{nh}	*22n	[n,2]	p2mm	Dih_{n}×Z_{2}	4n	C_{n}, σ_{h}, σ_{v}		Prismatic symmetry

The terms horizontal (h) and vertical (v), and the corresponding subscripts, refer to the additional mirror plane, that can be perpendicular to the rotation axis (horizontal) or contain it (vertical). In the generators column, C_{k} is a rotation by 360°/k about the main axis, σ_{h} and σ_{v} are reflections in a horizontal and a vertical plane, and U is a 180° rotation about a horizontal axis. For odd n we have Z_{2n} = Z_{n} × Z_{2} and Dih_{2n} = Dih_{n} × Z_{2}. The groups C_{n} (including the trivial C_{1}) and D_{n} are chiral, the others are achiral.

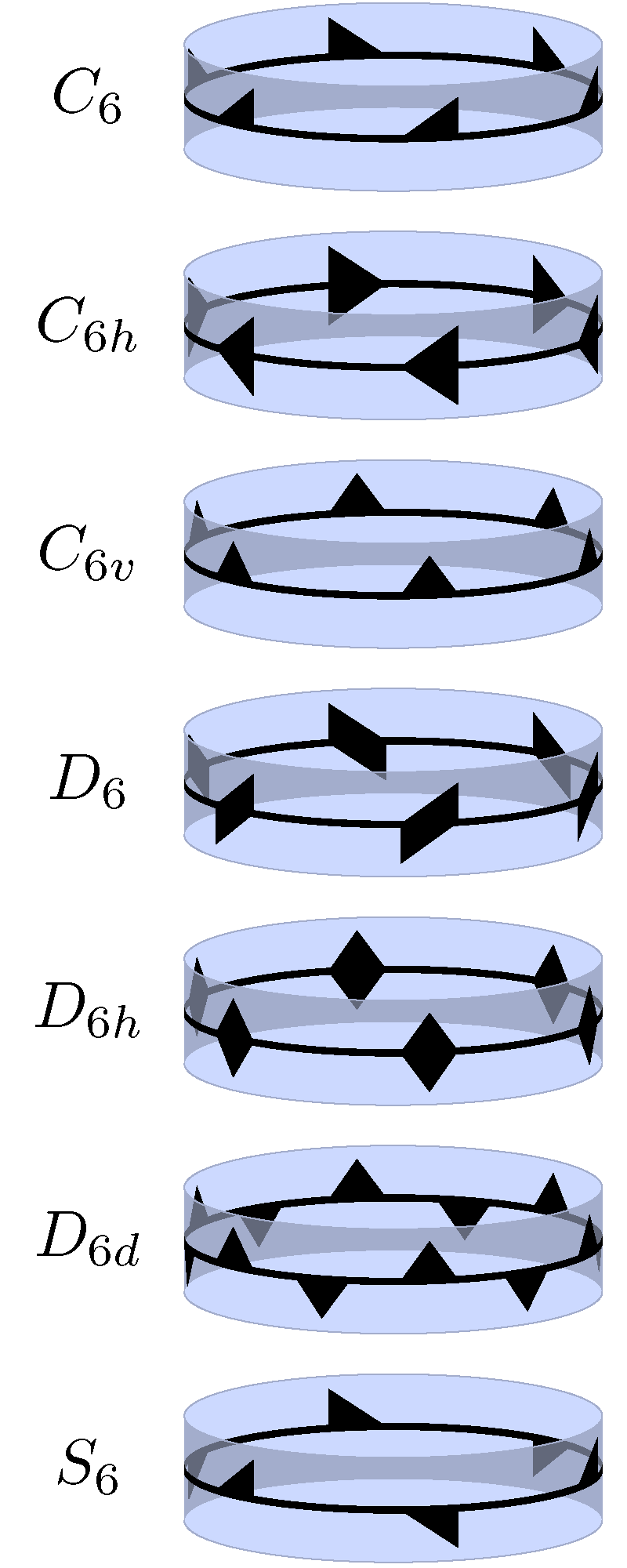
Patterns on a cylindrical band illustrating the case n = 6 for each of the 7 infinite families of point groups. The symmetry group of each pattern is the indicated group.

The cyclic groups C_{n} of order n are generated by a single rotation by 360°/n. Adding a mirror plane perpendicular to the axis gives the group C_{nh} of order 2n; adding n mirror planes containing the axis gives the group C_{nv}, also of order 2n, which is the symmetry group of a regular n-sided pyramid. The group S_{2n} of order 2n is generated by a rotation by 180°/n combined with a reflection in the horizontal plane. (For odd n, the analogous group S_{n} generated by a rotation by 360°/n and the reflection coincides with C_{nh}; therefore the notation S_{n} is only used for even n.) Like D_{nd} below, S_{2n} contains improper rotations without containing the corresponding rotations.

If both horizontal and vertical mirror planes are added, their intersections give n axes of rotation through 180°, so the group is no longer uniaxial. This group of order 4n is called D_{nh}; it is the symmetry group of a regular n-gonal prism and of a regular n-gonal bipyramid. Its subgroup of rotations is the dihedral group D_{n} of order 2n, which still has the 2-fold axes perpendicular to the main axis, but no mirror planes. (In 2D, D_{n} includes reflections, which can be viewed as flipping over flat objects; in 3D, D_{n} contains the flipping over, not reflections.) D_{n} is the symmetry group of a partially rotated ("twisted") prism; a typical object with symmetry group C_{n} or D_{n} is a propeller. Finally, D_{nd} (or D_{nv}) has vertical mirror planes, but instead of a horizontal mirror plane it has an isometry that combines a reflection in the horizontal plane with a rotation by 180°/n. It is the symmetry group of a regular n-gonal antiprism and of a regular n-gonal trapezohedron.

The groups D_{2} and D_{2h} are noteworthy in that there is no special rotation axis. Rather, there are three perpendicular 2-fold axes. D_{2} is a subgroup of all the polyhedral symmetries (see below), and D_{2h} is a subgroup of the polyhedral groups T_{h}, O_{h}, and I_{h}. D_{2} occurs in molecules such as twistane and in homotetramers such as Concanavalin A. The elements of D_{2} are in 1-to-2 correspondence with the rotations given by the unit Lipschitz quaternions.

All symmetry groups in the 7 infinite series are different, except for the following coincidences at n = 1 and 2:

- C_{1h} = C_{1v} = C_{s}: a single reflection – reflection symmetry, also called bilateral symmetry
- D_{1} = C_{2}: a single 180° rotation – 2-fold rotational symmetry
- D_{1h} = C_{2v}: order 4, with a reflection in a plane and a 180° rotation about a line in that plane
- D_{1d} = C_{2h}: order 4, with a reflection in a plane and a 180° rotation about a line perpendicular to that plane.

Moreover, S_{2} = C_{i} consists of a single inversion – inversion symmetry.

"Equal" is meant here as the same up to conjugacy in space, which is stronger than "up to algebraic isomorphism". For example, C_{s}, C_{2} and C_{i} are three different groups of order two in the first sense, but they are all isomorphic to Z_{2}. Similarly, S_{2n} is algebraically isomorphic with Z_{2n}.

== Polyhedral groups ==
The remaining point groups are said to be of very high or polyhedral symmetry because they have more than one rotation axis of order greater than 2. Here, C_{n} denotes an axis of rotation through 360°/n and S_{n} denotes an axis of improper rotation through the same. On successive lines are the orbifold notation, the Coxeter notation and Coxeter diagram, and the Hermann–Mauguin notation (full, and abbreviated if different) and the order (number of elements) of the symmetry group. The groups are:

T, (332) [3,3]^{+} 23 order 12	chiral tetrahedral symmetry	The three-fold rotational axes (C_{3}) of a tetrahedron The two-fold rotational axes (C_{2}) of a tetrahedron There are four C_{3} axes, each through two vertices of a circumscribing cube (red cube in images), or through one vertex of a regular tetrahedron, and three C_{2} axes, through the centers of the cube's faces, or the midpoints of the tetrahedron's edges. This group is isomorphic to A_{4}, the alternating group on 4 elements, and is the rotation group for a regular tetrahedron. It is a normal subgroup of T_{d}, T_{h}, and the octahedral symmetries. The elements of the group correspond 1-to-2 to the rotations given by the 24 unit Hurwitz quaternions (the "binary tetrahedral group").
T_{d}, (*332) [3,3] 4̅3m order 24	full tetrahedral symmetry	A mirror plane of a tetrahedron A four-fold rotation-reflection axis (S_{4}) of a tetrahedron This group is the symmetry group of a regular tetrahedron. This group has the same rotation axes as T, but the C_{2} axes become S_{4} axes, giving rise to three D_{2d} subgroups, whereas the four three-fold axes now give rise to four C_{3v} subgroups. This group has six mirror planes, each containing two edges of the cube or one edge of the tetrahedron, a single S_{4} axis, and two C_{3} axes. T_{d} is isomorphic to S_{4}, the symmetric group on 4 letters, because there is a 1-to-1 correspondence between the elements of T_{d} and the 24 permutations of the four 3-fold axes. An object of C_{3v} symmetry under one of the 3-fold axes gives rise under the action of T_{d} to an orbit consisting of four such objects, and T_{d} corresponds to the set of permutations of these four objects. T_{d} is a normal subgroup of O_{h}. See also the isometries of the regular tetrahedron.
T_{h}, (3*2) [3^{+},4] 2/m3̅, m3̅ order 24	pyritohedral symmetry	The seams of a volleyball have T_{h} symmetry. This group has the same rotation axes as T, with mirror planes parallel to the cube faces. The C_{3} axes become S_{6} axes, and there is inversion symmetry. The three two-fold axes together give rise to a single D_{2h} subgroup. T_{h} is isomorphic to A_{4} × Z_{2} (since T and C_{i} are both normal subgroups), and not to the symmetric group S_{4}. It is the symmetry of a cube with on each face a line segment dividing the face into two equal rectangles, such that the line segments of adjacent faces do not meet at the edge. The symmetries correspond to the even permutations of the body diagonals and the same combined with inversion. It is also the symmetry of a pyritohedron, which is similar to the cube described, with each rectangle replaced by a pentagon with one symmetry axis and 4 equal sides and 1 different side (the one corresponding to the line segment dividing the cube's face); i.e., the cube's faces bulge out at the dividing line and become narrower there. It is a subgroup (but not a normal subgroup) of the full icosahedral symmetry group (as isometry group, not just as abstract group), with 4 of the 10 3-fold axes. It is a normal subgroup of O_{h}. In spite of being called T_{h}, it does not apply to a tetrahedron.
O, (432) [4,3]^{+} 432 order 24	chiral octahedral symmetry	This group is like T, but the C_{2} axes are now C_{4} axes, and additionally there are two-fold rotation axes through the midpoints of the edges of the cube, giving rise to three D_{2} subgroups. The three-fold axes now give rise to four D_{3} subgroups. This group is also isomorphic to S_{4} because its elements are in 1-to-1 correspondence to the 24 permutations of the 3-fold axes, as with T_{d}. An object of D_{3} symmetry under one of the 3-fold axes gives rise under the action of O to an orbit consisting of four such objects, and O corresponds to the set of permutations of these four objects. It is the rotation group of the cube and octahedron. Representing rotations with quaternions, O is made up of the 24 unit Hurwitz quaternions and the 24 Lipschitz quaternions of squared norm 2 normalized by dividing by $\sqrt 2$. As before, this is a 1-to-2 correspondence.
O_{h}, (*432) [4,3] 4/m3̅2/m, m3̅m order 48	full octahedral symmetry	This group has the same rotation axes as O, but with mirror planes, comprising both the mirror planes of T_{d} and T_{h}. The three-fold axes give rise to four D_{3d} subgroups. The three perpendicular four-fold axes of O now give D_{4h} subgroups, while the six two-fold axes give three D_{2h} subgroups. This group is isomorphic to S_{4} × Z_{2} (because both O and C_{i} are normal subgroups), and is the symmetry group of the cube and octahedron. See also the isometries of the cube.
I, (532) [5,3]^{+} 532 order 60	chiral icosahedral symmetry	This is the rotation group of the icosahedron and the dodecahedron. It is a normal subgroup of index 2 in the full group of symmetries I_{h}. The group contains 10 versions of D_{3} and 6 versions of D_{5} (rotational symmetries like prisms and antiprisms). It also contains five versions of T (see Compound of five tetrahedra). The group I is isomorphic to A_{5}, the alternating group on 5 letters, since its elements correspond 1-to-1 with even permutations of the five T symmetries (or the five tetrahedra just mentioned). Representing rotations with quaternions, I is made up of the 120 unit icosians. As before, this is a 1-to-2 correspondence.
I_{h}, (*532) [5,3] 5̅3̅2/m, 5̅3̅m order 120	full icosahedral symmetry	This is the symmetry group of the icosahedron and the dodecahedron. The group I_{h} is isomorphic to A_{5} × Z_{2} because I and C_{i} are both normal subgroups. The group contains 10 versions of D_{3d}, 6 versions of D_{5d} (symmetries like antiprisms), and 5 versions of T_{h}.

The rotation groups T, O, and I, like all finite rotation groups, have twofold covers in the spin group Spin(3), the binary polyhedral groups. These are not point groups, but they are important in physics and chemistry as double groups.

== Continuous groups ==
Besides the finite groups, there are many infinite point groups. For example, a rotation by an irrational number of turns about an axis generates an infinite cyclic group. Adding more rotations about the same axis yields non-cyclic abelian groups; for instance, the rotations by rational numbers of degrees form a group that requires infinitely many generators. Rotations about different axes generically generate non-abelian free groups; they generate a finite group only for special choices. None of these groups is closed as a topological subgroup of O(3).

The topologically closed infinite point groups are the seven continuous limiting point groups or Curie limiting groups, named after Pierre Curie who was the first to investigate them. They are limits of the finite groups: the seven series of axial groups lead to five continuous axial groups (two pairs of series have the same limit), and the polyhedral groups lead to two more. In international notation, the list is ∞, ∞2, ∞/m, ∞mm, ∞/mm, ∞∞, and ∞∞m.

The continuous axial groups are designated by putting ∞ in place of n. Note however that C_{∞} here is not the same as the infinite cyclic group (also sometimes designated C_{∞}), which is isomorphic to the integers. The axial groups are limits of the finite groups only in the sense that they arise when the main rotation is replaced by rotation by an arbitrary angle, not necessarily a rational number of degrees.

H–M	Schönflies	Orbifold	Coxeter	Limit of	Abstract group
∞	C_{∞}	∞∞	[∞]^{+}	C_{n}	SO(2)
∞, ∞/m	C_{∞h}	∞*	[2,∞^{+}]	C_{nh}, S_{2n}	SO(2)×Z_{2}
∞m	C_{∞v}	*∞∞	[∞]	C_{nv}	O(2)
∞2	D_{∞}	22∞	[2,∞]^{+}	D_{n}	O(2)
∞m, ∞/mm	D_{∞h}	*22∞	[2,∞]	D_{nh}, D_{nd}	O(2)×Z_{2}

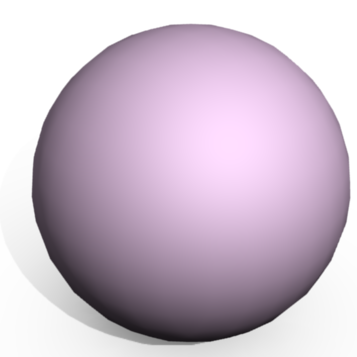
An unmarked sphere has O(3) symmetry.

The two continuous polyhedral groups are:

- ∞∞, K, or SO(3), all possible rotations;
- ∞∞m, K_{h}, or O(3), all possible rotations and reflections; this is the symmetry group of spherical symmetry.

The groups C_{∞v} and D_{∞h} are the symmetry groups of the two types of cylindrical symmetry. Any 3D shape (subset of R^{3}) that is invariant under all rotations about an axis is also invariant under the reflections in all planes through that axis; likewise, a shape with K symmetry has K_{h} symmetry. Therefore, physical objects can only have C_{∞v}, D_{∞h} or K_{h} symmetry. Vector fields can have the other symmetries, for instance the velocity vectors of a cone rotating about its axis, or the magnetic field surrounding a wire.

== Subgroup relations ==
=== Rotation groups ===
The rotation groups, i.e., the finite subgroups of SO(3), are: the cyclic groups C_{n} (the rotation group of a canonical pyramid), the dihedral groups D_{n} (the rotation group of a uniform prism, or canonical bipyramid), and the rotation groups T, O and I of a regular tetrahedron, octahedron/cube and icosahedron/dodecahedron.

In particular, the dihedral groups D_{3}, D_{4} etc. are the rotation groups of plane regular polygons embedded in three-dimensional space, and such a figure may be considered as a degenerate regular prism. Therefore, it is also called a dihedron (Greek: solid with two faces), which explains the name dihedral group.

- An object having symmetry group C_{n}, C_{nh}, C_{nv} or S_{2n} has rotation group C_{n}.
- An object having symmetry group D_{n}, D_{nh}, or D_{nd} has rotation group D_{n}.
- An object having a polyhedral symmetry (T, T_{d}, T_{h}, O, O_{h}, I or I_{h}) has as its rotation group the corresponding one without a subscript: T, O or I.

The rotation group of an object is equal to its full symmetry group if and only if the object is chiral. In other words, the chiral objects are those with their symmetry group in the list of rotation groups. Otherwise, the rotation group is a normal subgroup of index 2 of the full symmetry group, namely the kernel of the determinant.

Given in Schönflies notation, Coxeter notation, (orbifold notation), the rotation subgroups are:

Reflection	Reflection/rotational	Improper rotation	Rotation
C_{nv}, [n], (*nn)	C_{nh}, [n^{+},2], (n*)	S_{2n}, [2n^{+},2^{+}], (n×)	C_{n}, [n]^{+}, (nn)
D_{nh}, [2,n], (*n22)	D_{nd}, [2^{+},2n], (2*n)		D_{n}, [2,n]^{+}, (n22)
T_{d}, [3,3], (*332)	T_{h}, [3^{+},4], (3*2)		T, [3,3]^{+}, (332)
O_{h}, [4,3], (*432)			O, [4,3]^{+}, (432)
I_{h}, [5,3], (*532)			I, [5,3]^{+}, (532)

=== Groups containing inversion ===
The rotation group SO(3) is a subgroup of O(3), the full point group of the 3D Euclidean space. Correspondingly, O(3) is the direct product of SO(3) and the inversion group C_{i} (where inversion is denoted by its matrix −I):

O(3) = SO(3) × { I , −I }

Thus there is a 1-to-1 correspondence between all direct isometries and all indirect isometries, through inversion. Also there is a 1-to-1 correspondence between all groups H of direct isometries in SO(3) and all groups K of isometries in O(3) that contain inversion:

K = H × { I , −I }
H = K ∩ SO(3)

where the isometry ( A, I ) is identified with A.

For finite groups, the correspondence is:

Rotation group H	Parity of n	Group containing inversion K
C_{n}	even	C_{nh}
C_{n}	odd	S_{2n}
D_{n}	even	D_{nh}
D_{n}	odd	D_{nd}
T		T_{h}
O		O_{h}
I		I_{h}

=== Groups containing indirect isometries but no inversion ===
If a group of direct isometries H has a subgroup L of index 2, then there is a corresponding group that contains indirect isometries but no inversion:

$$M = L \cup ( (H \smallsetminus L) \times \{ -I \})$$

For example, H = C_{4} corresponds to M = S_{4}.

Thus M is obtained from H by inverting the isometries in $H \smallsetminus L$. This group M is, when considered as an abstract group, isomorphic to H. Conversely, for all point groups M that contain indirect isometries but no inversion we can obtain a rotation group H by inverting the indirect isometries.

For finite groups, the correspondence is:

Rotation group H	Index-2 subgroup L	Parity of n	Group containing indirect isometries M
C_{2n}	C_{n}	even	S_{2n}
C_{2n}	C_{n}	odd	C_{nh}
D_{2n}	D_{n}	even	D_{nd}
D_{2n}	D_{n}	odd	D_{nh}
D_{n}	C_{n}	any	C_{nv}
O	T		T_{d}

=== Reflective Coxeter groups ===
Fundamental domains of 3D Coxeter groups
A_{3}, [3,3],	B_{3}, [4,3],	H_{3}, [5,3],
6 mirrors	3+6 mirrors	15 mirrors
2A_{1}, [1,2],	3A_{1}, [2,2],	A_{1}A_{2}, [2,3],
2 mirrors	3 mirrors	4 mirrors
A_{1}, [1],	2A_{1}, [2],	A_{2}, [3],
1 mirror	2 mirrors	3 mirrors

The reflective point groups in three dimensions are also called Coxeter groups and can be given by a Coxeter-Dynkin diagram and represent a set of mirrors that intersect at one central point. Coxeter notation offers a bracketed notation equivalent to the Coxeter diagram, with markup symbols for rotational and other subsymmetry point groups. In Schoenflies notation, the reflective point groups in 3D are C_{nv}, D_{nh}, and the full polyhedral groups T_{d}, O_{h}, and I_{h}.

The mirror planes bound a set of spherical triangle domains on the surface of a sphere. A rank n Coxeter group is generated by the reflections in n mirror planes. Coxeter groups having fewer than 3 generators have degenerate spherical triangle domains, as lunes or a hemisphere. In Coxeter notation these groups are tetrahedral symmetry [3,3], octahedral symmetry [4,3], icosahedral symmetry [5,3], and dihedral symmetry [p,2]. The number of mirrors for an irreducible group is nh/2, where h is the Coxeter group's Coxeter number, n is the dimension (3).

Weyl group	Coxeter notation	Order	Coxeter number (h)	Mirrors (m)
Polyhedral groups
A_{3}	[3,3]	24	4	6
B_{3}	[4,3]	48	6	3+6
H_{3}	[5,3]	120	10	15
Dihedral groups
2A_{1}	[1,2]	4		1+1
3A_{1}	[2,2]	8		2+1
I_{2}(p)A_{1}	[p,2]	4p		p+1
Cyclic groups
2A_{1}	[2]	4		2
I_{2}(p)	[p]	2p		p
Single mirror
A_{1}	[ ]	2		1

=== Maximal symmetries ===
There are two discrete point groups with the property that no discrete point group has it as proper subgroup: O_{h} and I_{h}. Their largest common subgroup is T_{h}. The two groups are obtained from it by changing 2-fold rotational symmetry to 4-fold, and adding 5-fold symmetry, respectively.

There are two crystallographic point groups with the property that no crystallographic point group has it as proper subgroup: O_{h} and D_{6h}. Their maximal common subgroups, depending on orientation, are D_{3d} and D_{2h}.

== The groups arranged by abstract group type ==
The smallest abstract groups that are not any symmetry group in 3D, are the quaternion group (of order 8), Z_{3} × Z_{3} (of order 9), the dicyclic group Dic_{3} (of order 12), and 10 of the 14 groups of order 16.

The column "# of order 2 elements" in the following tables counts the 2-fold rotations, reflections, and inversion contained in a group; this number helps to distinguish abstract group types. Among the 3D point groups, there are infinitely many abstract group types with 0, 1 and 3 elements of order 2, two with 4n + 1, and three with 4n + 3 elements of order 2 (for each n ≥ 8).

=== Symmetry groups in 3D that are cyclic as abstract group ===
The symmetry group for n-fold rotational symmetry is C_{n}; its abstract group type is cyclic group Z_{n}, which is also denoted by C_{n}. However, there are two more infinite series of symmetry groups with this abstract group type:

- S_{2n} of order 2n, including S_{2} = C_{i};
- C_{nh} of order 2n for odd n, including C_{1h} = C_{s}.

Thus we have, with the 10 crystallographic point groups in bold:

Order	Isometry groups	Abstract group	# of order 2 elements	Cycle diagram
1	**C_{1}**	Z_{1}	0	
2	**C_{2}**, **C_{i}**, **C_{s}**	Z_{2}	1	
3	**C_{3}**	Z_{3}	0	
4	**C_{4}**, **S_{4}**	Z_{4}	1	
5	C_{5}	Z_{5}	0	
6	**C_{6}**, **S_{6}**, **C_{3h}**	Z_{6} = Z_{3} × Z_{2}	1	
7	C_{7}	Z_{7}	0	
8	C_{8}, S_{8}	Z_{8}	1	
9	C_{9}	Z_{9}	0	
10	C_{10}, S_{10}, C_{5h}	Z_{10} = Z_{5} × Z_{2}	1	

etc.

=== Symmetry groups in 3D that are dihedral as abstract group ===
The symmetry group D_{n}, with n 2-fold axes perpendicular to the n-fold axis, is of abstract group type dihedral group Dih_{n}, which is also denoted by D_{n}. D_{n} is the full symmetry group of a regular prism, bipyramid, antiprism or trapezohedron that has been made chiral, for example by an identical chiral marking on every face. However, there are three more infinite series of symmetry groups with this abstract group type:

- C_{nv} of order 2n, the symmetry group of a regular n-sided pyramid
- D_{nd} of order 4n, the symmetry group of a regular n-sided antiprism
- D_{nh} of order 4n for odd n, since then Dih_{n} × Z_{2} ≅ Dih_{2n}. For n = 1 we get D_{1h} = C_{2v}, already covered above, so n ≥ 3.

Thus we have, with the 12 crystallographic point groups in bold, and writing D_{1d} as the equivalent C_{2h}:

Order	Isometry groups	Abstract group	# of order 2 elements	Cycle diagram
4	**D_{2}**, **C_{2v}**, **C_{2h}**	Dih_{2} = Z_{2} × Z_{2}	3	
6	**D_{3}**, **C_{3v}**	Dih_{3}	3	
8	**D_{4}**, **C_{4v}**, **D_{2d}**	Dih_{4}	5	
10	D_{5}, C_{5v}	Dih_{5}	5	
12	**D_{6}**, **C_{6v}**, **D_{3d}**, **D_{3h}**	Dih_{6} = Dih_{3} × Z_{2}	7	
14	D_{7}, C_{7v}	Dih_{7}	7	
16	D_{8}, C_{8v}, D_{4d}	Dih_{8}	9	
18	D_{9}, C_{9v}	Dih_{9}	9	
20	D_{10}, C_{10v}, D_{5h}, D_{5d}	Dih_{10} = Dih_{5} × Z_{2}	11	

etc.

=== Other axial groups ===
C_{2n,h} of order 4n is of abstract group type Z_{2n} × Z_{2}. For n = 1 we get Dih_{2}, already covered above, so n ≥ 2.

Thus we have, with the 2 crystallographic point groups in bold:

Order	Isometry group	Abstract group	# of order 2 elements	Cycle diagram
8	**C_{4h}**	Z_{4} × Z_{2}	3	
12	**C_{6h}**	Z_{6} × Z_{2} = Z_{3} × Z_{2}^{2} = Z_{3} × Dih_{2}	3	
16	C_{8h}	Z_{8} × Z_{2}	3	
20	C_{10h}	Z_{10} × Z_{2} = Z_{5} × Z_{2}^{2} = Z_{5} × Dih_{2}	3	

etc.

D_{nh} of order 4n is of abstract group type Dih_{n} × Z_{2}. For odd n this is already covered above, so we have here D_{2nh} of order 8n, which is of abstract group type Dih_{2n} × Z_{2} (n≥1).

Thus we have, with the 3 crystallographic point groups in bold:

Order	Isometry group	Abstract group	# of order 2 elements	Cycle diagram
8	**D_{2h}**	Z_{2}^{3}	7	
16	**D_{4h}**	Dih_{4} × Z_{2}	11	
24	**D_{6h}**	Dih_{6} × Z_{2} = Dih_{3} × Z_{2}^{2}	15	
32	D_{8h}	Dih_{8} × Z_{2}	19	

etc.

=== The seven polyhedral groups ===
With the 5 crystallographic point groups in bold:

Order	Isometry group	Abstract group	# of order 2 elements	Cycle diagram
12	**T**	A_{4}	3	
24	**T_{d}**, **O**	S_{4}	9	
24	**T_{h}**	A_{4} × Z_{2}	7	
48	**O_{h}**	S_{4} × Z_{2}	19	
60	I	A_{5}	15	
120	I_{h}	A_{5} × Z_{2}	31	

== Fundamental domain ==
Disdyakis triacontahedron
The planes of reflection for icosahedral symmetry intersect the sphere on great circles, with right spherical triangle fundamental domains.

The fundamental domain of a finite point group is a cone with apex at the origin, whose images under the group elements fill space without overlapping. An object with a given symmetry is therefore determined by its part within the fundamental domain. For the reflection groups, the fundamental domain is bounded by mirror planes (see § Reflective Coxeter groups).

For example, the cones from the center over the 120 faces of the disdyakis triacontahedron are the fundamental domains of full icosahedral symmetry I_{h}. Tilting the plane of such a face yields other polyhedra with the same symmetry, in which adjacent faces may merge.

== See also ==
- Point groups in two dimensions
- Point groups in four dimensions
