= Symmetry element =

Point, line, or plane about which a molecule or crystal is symmetric

In chemistry and crystallography, a symmetry element is a point, line, or plane about which symmetry operations can take place. In particular, a symmetry element can be a mirror plane, an axis of rotation (either proper and improper), or a center of inversion. For an object such as a molecule or a crystal, a symmetry element corresponds to a set of symmetry operations, which are the rigid transformations employing the symmetry element that leave the object unchanged. The set containing these operations form one of the symmetry groups of the object. The elements of this symmetry group should not be confused with the "symmetry element" itself. Loosely, a symmetry element is the geometric set of fixed points of a symmetry operation. For example, for rotation about an axis, the points on the axis do not move and in a reflection the points that remain unchanged make up a plane of symmetry.

== Identity ==
The identity symmetry element is found in all objects and is denoted E. It corresponds to an operation of doing nothing to the object. Because every molecule is indistinguishable from itself if nothing is done to it, every object possesses at least the identity element. An object having no symmetry elements other than E is called asymmetric. Such an object is necessarily chiral.

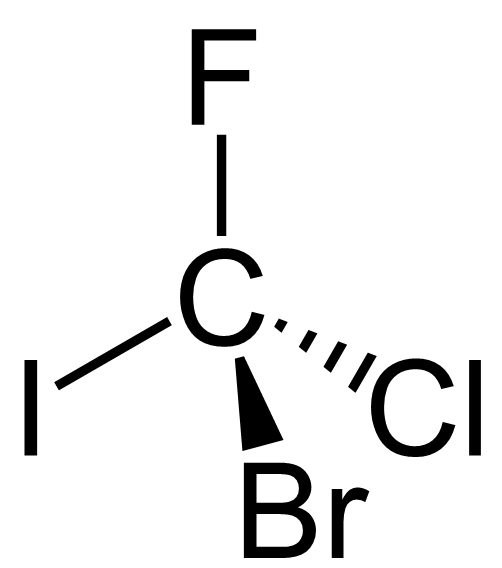
A bromochlorofluoroiodomethane molecule is asymmetric: it has no symmetries except the identity.

== Mirror planes ==
Mirror planes are denoted by σ. In a molecule that also has an axis of symmetry, a mirror plane that includes the axis is called a vertical mirror plane and is labeled σ_{v} , while one perpendicular to the axis is called a horizontal mirror plane and is labeled σ_{h} . A vertical mirror plane that bisects the angle between two C2 axes is called a dihedral mirror plane, σ_{d} .

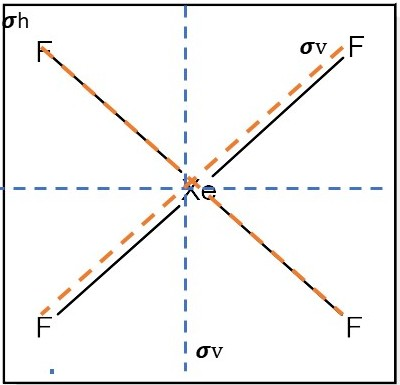
Mirror planes of XeF_{4}

== Rotational symmetry ==
Rotational symmetry, also known as radial symmetry, is represented by an axis about which the object rotates in its corresponding symmetry operation. A group of proper rotations is denoted as C_{n}, where the degrees of rotation that restore the object is 360/n (C_{2}= 180º rotation, C_{3}= 120º rotation, C_{4}= 90º rotation, C_{5}= 72º rotation). The C_{n} notation is also used for the related, more abstract, cyclic group.

An improper rotation is the composition of a rotation about an axis, and reflection in a plane perpendicular to that axis. The order in which the rotation and reflection are performed does not matter (that is, these operations commute). Improper rotation is also defined as the composition of a rotation about an axis, and inversion about a point on the axis. These definitions are equivalent because inversion about a point is equivalent to rotation by 180° about any axis, followed by mirroring about a plane perpendicular to that axis. The symmetry elements for improper rotation are the rotation axis, and either the mirror plane, the inversion point, or both. The improper rotation group of order 2n is denoted S_{2n}.

== Inversion ==
For inversion, denoted i, there must be a point in the center of an object that is the inversion center. Inversion consists of passing each point through the center of inversion and out to the same distance on the other side of the molecule. In the inversion operation for 3D coordinates, the inversion center is the origin (0,0,0). When an object is inverted, the position vector of a point in an object, ⟨x,y,z⟩, is inverted to ⟨-x,-y,-z⟩.

== Gallery ==
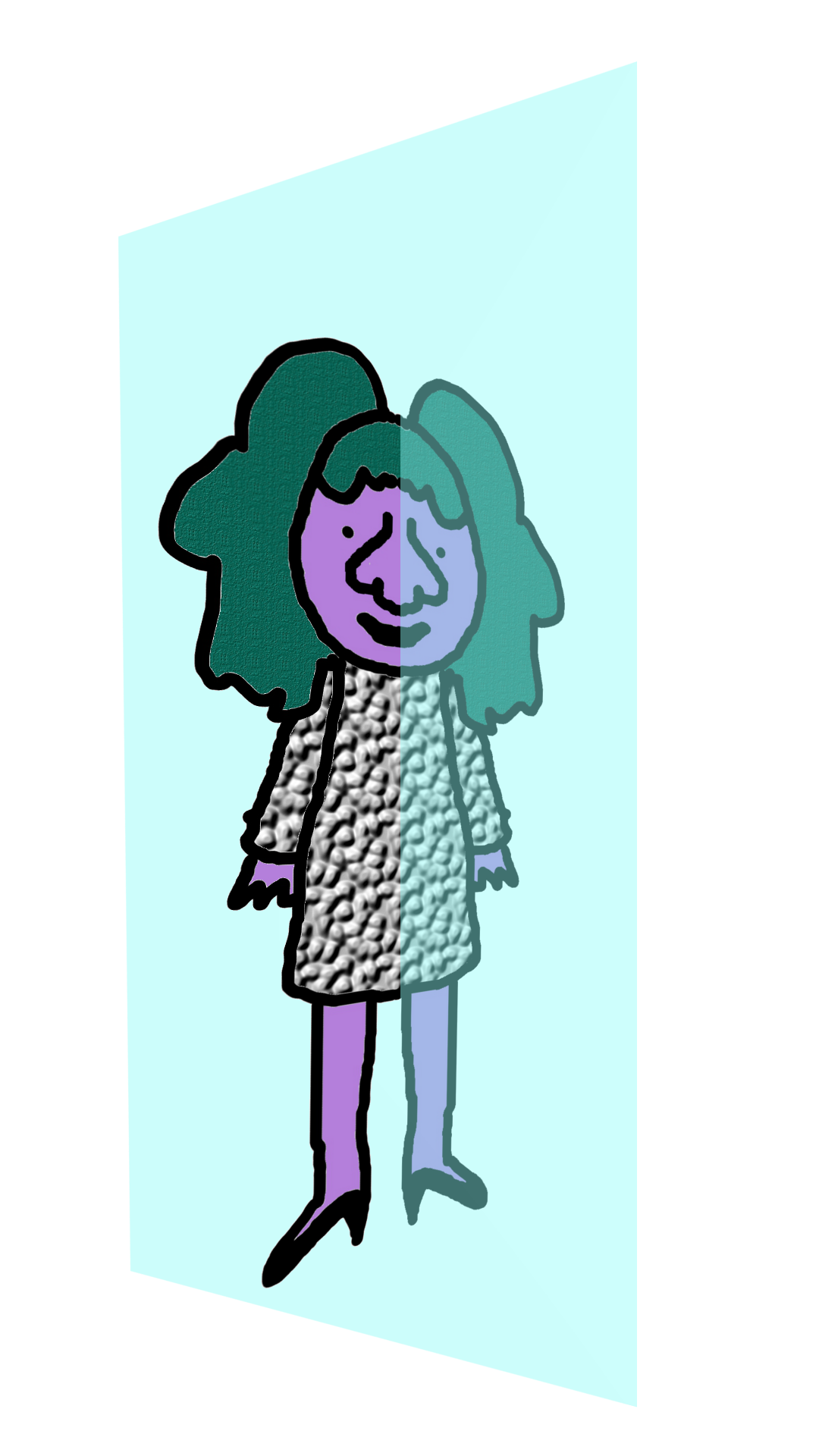
Example of vertical mirror plane.

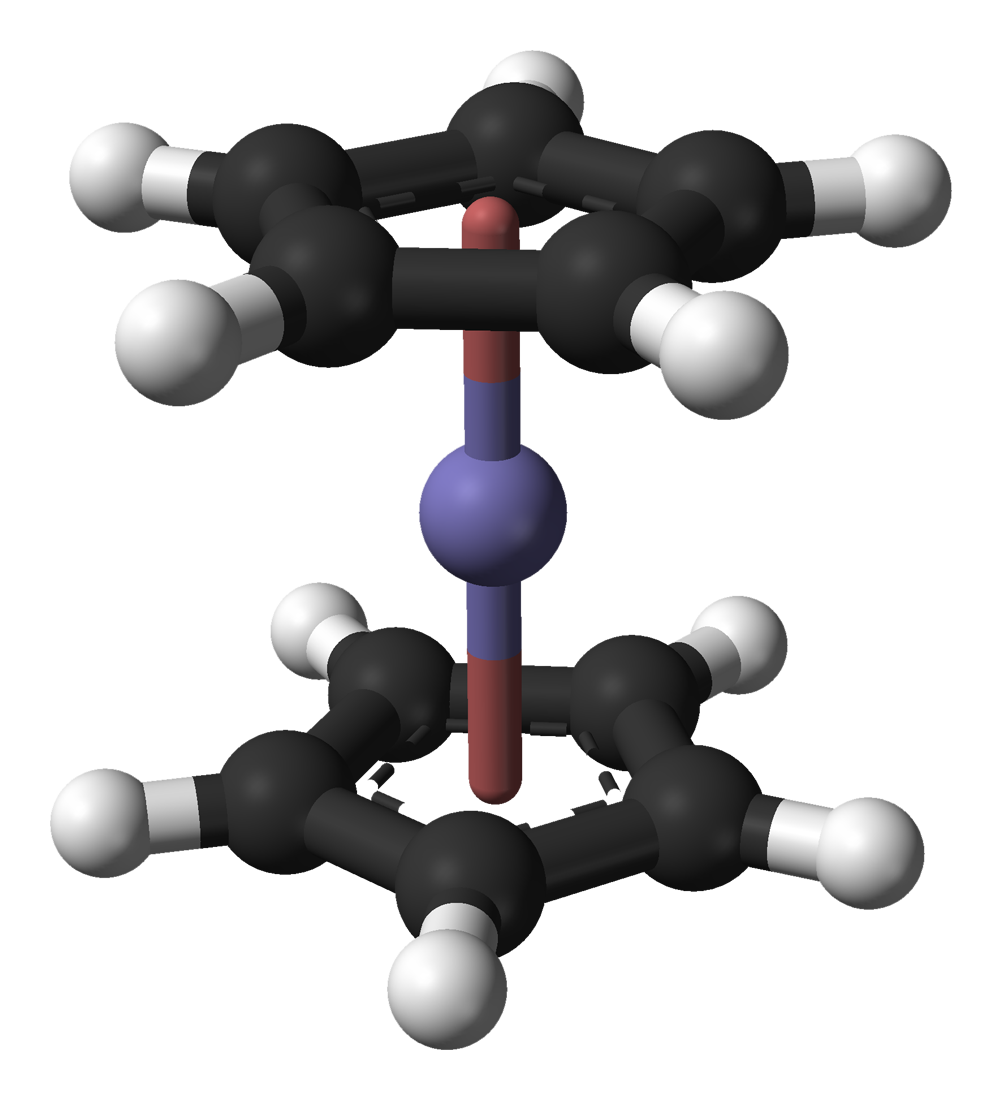
Staggered ferrocene molecule, possessing an S_{10} improper rotation axis, a C_{5} rotation axis, five C_{2} rotation axes, five dihedral mirror planes (σ_{d}), and a center of inversion (i).

== See also ==
- Symmetry
- Group theory
- Crystallography
- Hermann-Mauguin notation
- Schoenflies notation
