= Symmetry operation =

Geometric transformation which produces an identical image

In mathematics, a symmetry operation is a geometric transformation of an object that leaves the object looking the same after it has been carried out. For example, a 1/3 turn rotation of a regular triangle about its center, a reflection of a square across its diagonal, a translation of the Euclidean plane, or a point reflection of a sphere through its center are all symmetry operations. Each symmetry operation is performed with respect to some symmetry element (a point, line, or plane).

In the context of molecular symmetry, a symmetry operation is a permutation of atoms such that the molecule or crystal is transformed into a state indistinguishable from the starting state. Two basic facts follow from this definition, which emphasizes its usefulness.

1. Physical properties must be invariant with respect to symmetry operations.
2. Symmetry operations can be collected together in groups which are isomorphic to permutation groups.

In the context of molecular symmetry, quantum wavefunctions need not be invariant, because the operation can multiply them by a phase or mix states within a degenerate representation, without affecting any physical property.

== Molecules ==
=== Identity Operation ===
The identity operation corresponds to doing nothing to the object. Because every molecule is indistinguishable from itself if nothing is done to it, every object possesses at least the identity operation. The identity operation is denoted by E or I. In the identity operation, no change can be observed for the molecule. Even the most asymmetric molecule possesses the identity operation. The need for such an identity operation arises from the mathematical requirements of group theory.

=== Reflection through mirror planes ===
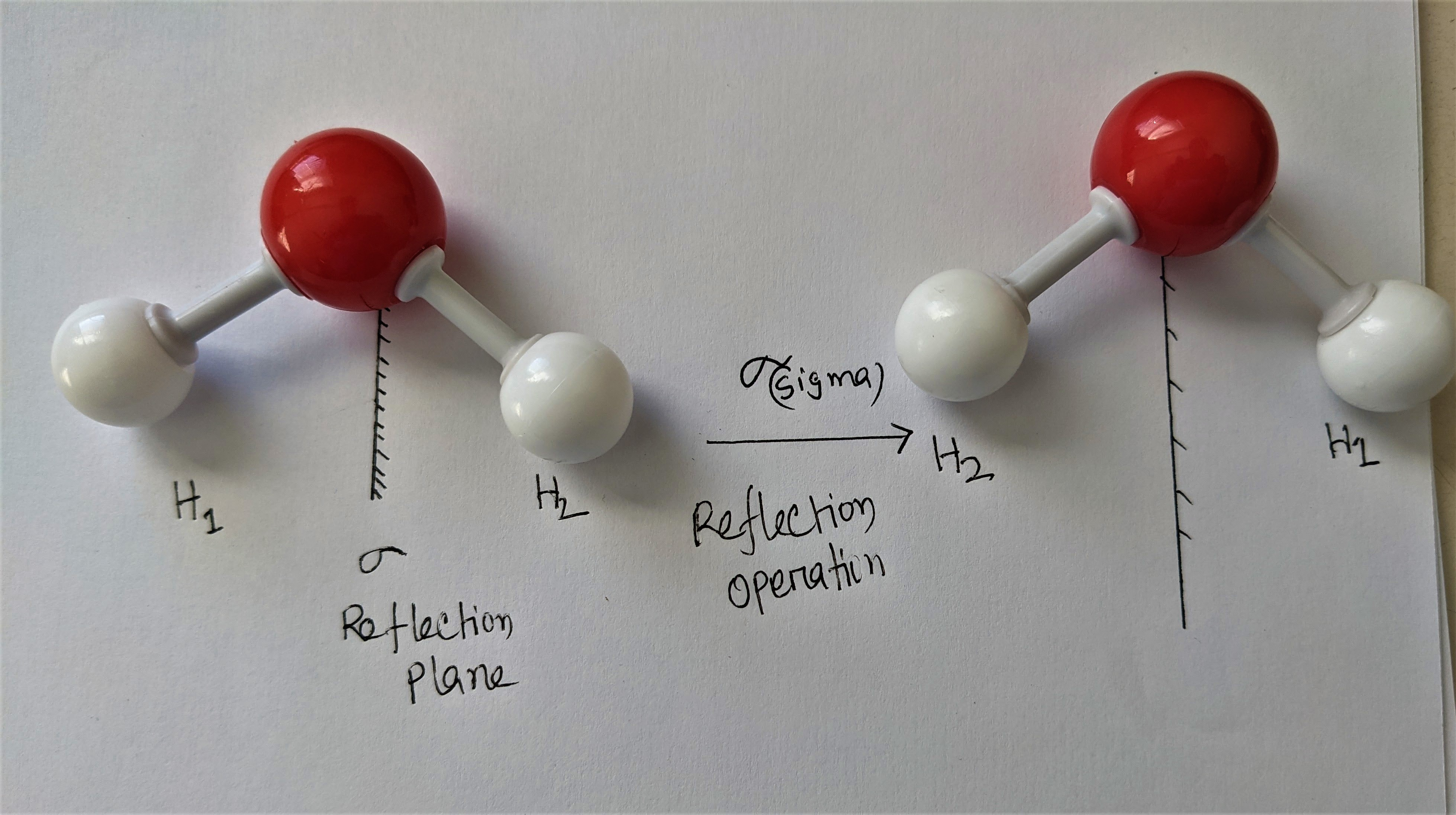
Reflection operation

The reflection operation is carried out with respect to symmetry elements known as planes of symmetry or mirror planes. Each such plane is denoted as σ (sigma). Its orientation relative to the principal axis of the molecule is indicated by a subscript. The plane must pass through the molecule and cannot be completely outside it.

- If the plane of symmetry contains the principal axis of the molecule (i.e., the molecular z-axis), it is designated as a vertical mirror plane, which is indicated by a subscript v (σ_{v}).
- If the plane of symmetry is perpendicular to the principal axis, it is designated as a horizontal mirror plane, which is indicated by a subscript h (σ_{h}).
- If the plane of symmetry bisects the angle between two 2-fold axes perpendicular to the principal axis, it is designated as a dihedral mirror plane, which is indicated by a subscript d (σ_{d}).

Through the reflection of each mirror plane, the molecule must be able to produce an identical image of itself.

=== Inversion operation ===
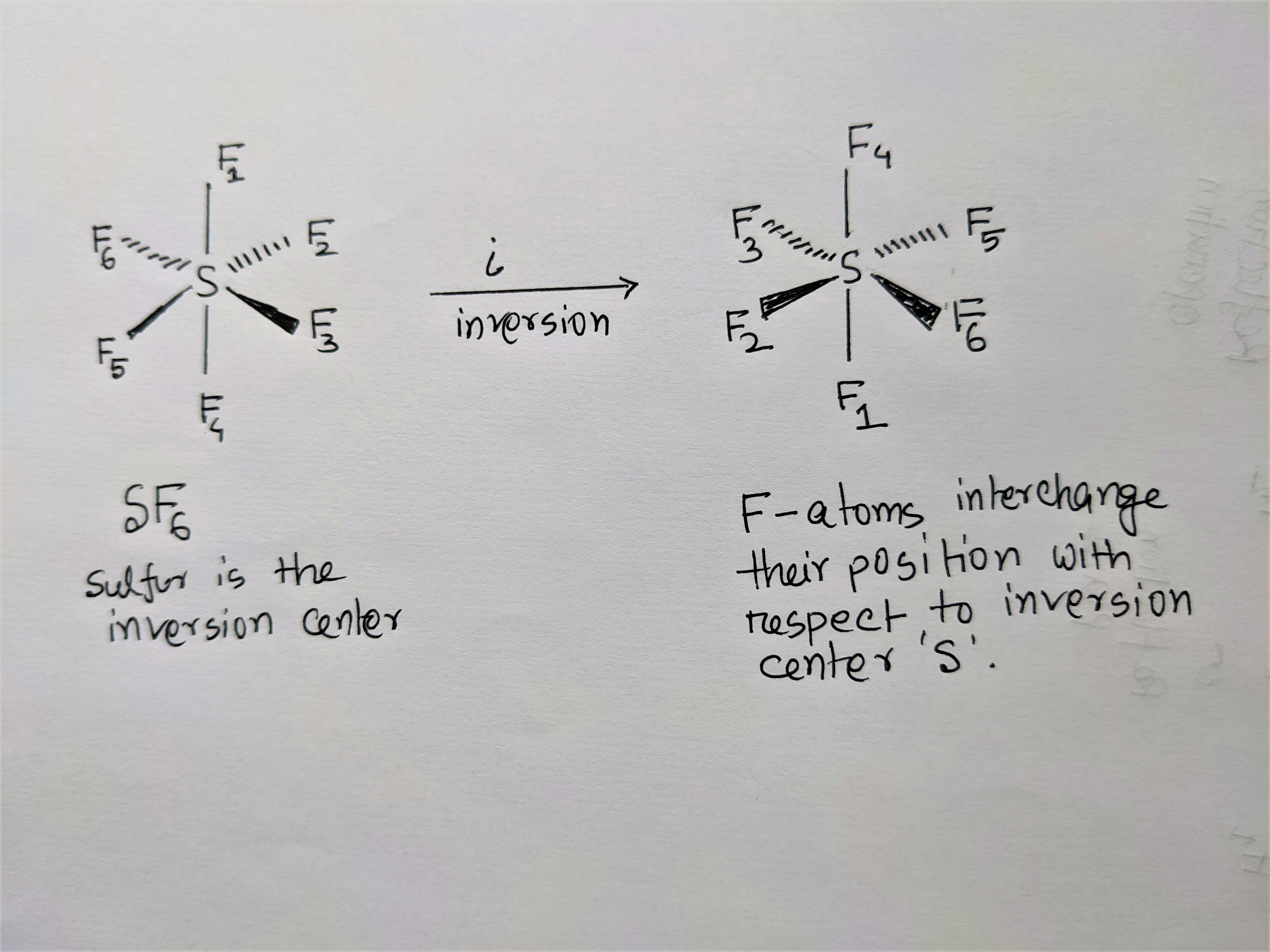
Inversion operation is shown here with a sulfur hexafluoride molecule. All of the fluorine atoms change their position to opposite side with respect to the sulfur center

In an inversion through a centre of symmetry, i (the element), we imagine taking each point in a molecule and then moving it out the same distance on the other side. In summary, the inversion operation projects each atom through the centre of inversion and out to the same distance on the opposite side. The inversion center is a point in space that lies in the geometric center of the molecule. As a result, all the Cartesian coordinates of the atoms are inverted (i.e. x,y,z to –x,–y,–z). The symbol used to represent the inversion center is i. When the inversion operation is carried out n times, it is denoted by i^{n}, where $i^n=E$ when n is even and $i^n=-E$ when n is odd.

Examples of molecules that have an inversion center include certain molecules with octahedral geometry (general formula AB_{6}), square planar geometry (general formula AB_{4}), and ethylene (H_{2}C=CH_{2}). Examples of molecules without inversion centers are cyclopentadienide (C_{5}H^{−}_{5}) and molecules with trigonal pyramidal geometry (general formula AB_{3}).

=== Proper rotation operations or n-fold rotation ===
A proper rotation refers to simple rotation about an axis. Such operations are denoted by $C_n^m,$ where C_{n} is a rotation of $\tfrac{360^\circ}{n}$ or $\tfrac{2\pi}{n},$ performed m times. The superscript m is omitted if it is equal to one. C_{1} is a rotation through 360°, where n = 1. It is equivalent to the Identity (E) operation. C_{2} is a rotation of 180°, as $\tfrac{360^\circ}{2} = 180^\circ,$ C_{3} is a rotation of 120°, as $\tfrac{360^\circ}{3} = 120^\circ,$ and so on.

Here the molecule can be rotated into equivalent positions around an axis. An example of a molecule with C_{2} symmetry is the water (H_{2}O) molecule. If the H_{2}O molecule is rotated by 180° about an axis passing through the oxygen atom, no detectable difference before and after the C_{2} operation is observed.

Order n of an axis can be regarded as the number of times that, for the least rotation which gives an equivalent configuration, that rotation must be repeated to give a configuration identical to the original structure (i.e. a 360° or 2π rotation). An example of this is C_{3} proper rotation, which rotates by $\tfrac{2\pi}{3}.$ C_{3} represents the first rotation around the C_{3} axis by $\tfrac{2\pi}{3},$ $C_3^2$ is the rotation by $2\times\tfrac{2\pi}{3},$ while $C_3^3$ is the rotation by $3\times\tfrac{2\pi}{3}.$ $C_3^3$ is the identical configuration because it gives the original structure, and it is called an identity element (E). Therefore, C_{3} is an order of three and is often referred to as a threefold axis.

=== Improper rotation operations ===
An improper rotation involves two operation steps: a proper rotation followed by reflection through a plane perpendicular to the rotation axis. The improper rotation is represented by the symbol S_{n} where n is the order. Since the improper rotation is the combination of a proper rotation and a reflection, S_{n} will always exist whenever C_{n} and a perpendicular plane exist separately. S_{1} is usually denoted as σ, a reflection operation about a mirror plane. S_{2} is usually denoted as i, an inversion operation about an inversion center. When n is an even number $S_n^n = E,$ but when n is odd $S_n^{2n} = E.$

Rotation axes, mirror planes and inversion centres are symmetry elements, not symmetry operations. The rotation axis of the highest order is known as the principal rotation axis. It is conventional to set the Cartesian z-axis of the molecule to contain the principal rotation axis.

=== Examples ===
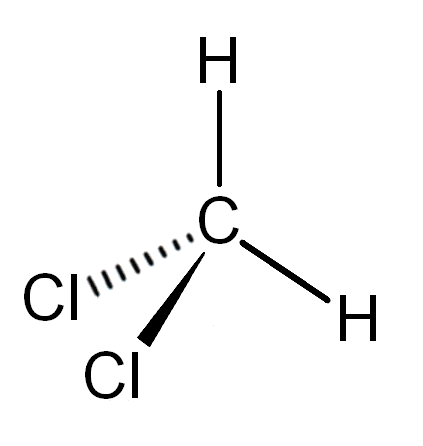

Dichloromethane, CH_{2}Cl_{2}. There is a C_{2} rotation axis which passes through the carbon atom and the midpoints between the two hydrogen atoms and the two chlorine atoms. Define the z axis as co-linear with the C_{2} axis, the xz plane as containing CH_{2} and the yz plane as containing CCl_{2}. A C_{2} rotation operation permutes the two hydrogen atoms and the two chlorine atoms. Reflection in the yz plane permutes the hydrogen atoms while reflection in the xz plane permutes the chlorine atoms. The four symmetry operations E, C_{2}, σ(xz) and σ(yz) form the point group C_{2v}. Note that if any two operations are carried out in succession, the result is the same as if a single operation of the group had been performed.

Methane, CH_{4}. In addition to the proper rotations of order 2 and 3 there are three mutually perpendicular S_{4} axes which pass halfway between the C-H bonds and six mirror planes. Note that $S_4^2 = C_2.$

== Crystals ==
In crystals, screw rotations and/or glide reflections are additionally possible. These are rotations or reflections together with partial translation. These operations may change based on the dimensions of the crystal lattice.

The Bravais lattices may be considered as representing translational symmetry operations. Combinations of operations of the crystallographic point groups with the addition symmetry operations produce the 230 crystallographic space groups.

== See also ==
Molecular symmetry

Crystal structure

Crystallographic restriction theorem
