= Polyhedral group =

Geometric polyhedral group

In geometry, the polyhedral groups are the symmetry groups of the Platonic solids.

== Groups ==
There are three polyhedral groups:

- The tetrahedral group of order 12, rotational symmetry group of the regular tetrahedron. It is isomorphic to A_{4}.
  - The conjugacy classes of T are:
    - identity
    - 4 × rotation by 120°, order 3, cw
    - 4 × rotation by 120°, order 3, ccw
    - 3 × rotation by 180°, order 2
- The octahedral group of order 24, rotational symmetry group of the cube and the regular octahedron. It is isomorphic to S_{4}.
  - The conjugacy classes of O are:
    - identity
    - 6 × rotation by ±90° around vertices, order 4
    - 8 × rotation by ±120° around triangle centers, order 3
    - 3 × rotation by 180° around vertices, order 2
    - 6 × rotation by 180° around midpoints of edges, order 2
- The icosahedral group of order 60, rotational symmetry group of the regular dodecahedron and the regular icosahedron. It is isomorphic to A_{5}.
  - The conjugacy classes of I are:
    - identity
    - 12 × rotation by ±72°, order 5
    - 12 × rotation by ±144°, order 5
    - 20 × rotation by ±120°, order 3
    - 15 × rotation by 180°, order 2

These symmetries double to 24, 48, 120 respectively for the full reflectional groups. The reflection symmetries have 6, 9, and 15 mirrors respectively. The octahedral symmetry, [4,3] can be seen as the union of 6 tetrahedral symmetry [3,3] mirrors, and 3 mirrors of dihedral symmetry Dih_{2}, [2,2]. Pyritohedral symmetry is another doubling of tetrahedral symmetry.

The conjugacy classes of full tetrahedral symmetry, T_{d} ≅ S_{4}, are:

- identity
- 8 × rotation by 120°
- 3 × rotation by 180°
- 6 × reflection in a plane through two rotation axes
- 6 × rotoreflection by 90°

The conjugacy classes of pyritohedral symmetry, T_{h}, include those of T, with the two classes of 4 combined, and each with inversion:

- identity
- 8 × rotation by 120°
- 3 × rotation by 180°
- inversion
- 8 × rotoreflection by 60°
- 3 × reflection in a plane

The conjugacy classes of the full octahedral group, O_{h} ≅ S_{4} × C_{2}, are:

- inversion
- 6 × rotoreflection by 90°
- 8 × rotoreflection by 60°
- 3 × reflection in a plane perpendicular to a 4-fold axis
- 6 × reflection in a plane perpendicular to a 2-fold axis

The conjugacy classes of full icosahedral symmetry, I_{h} ≅ A_{5} × C_{2}, include also each with inversion:

- inversion
- 12 × rotoreflection by 108°, order 10
- 12 × rotoreflection by 36°, order 10
- 20 × rotoreflection by 60°, order 6
- 15 × reflection, order 2

== Chiral polyhedral groups ==
Chiral polyhedral groups
Name (Orb.)	Coxeter notation	Order	Abstract structure	Rotation points #_{valence}	Diagrams	
Name (Orb.)	Coxeter notation	Order	Abstract structure	Rotation points #_{valence}	Orthogonal	Stereographic
T (332)	[3,3]^{+}	12	A_{4}	4_{3} 3_{2}		
T_{h} (3*2)	[4,3^{+}]	24	A_{4} × C_{2}	4_{3} 3_{*2}		
O (432)	[4,3]^{+}	24	S_{4}	3_{4} 4_{3} 6_{2}		
I (532)	[5,3]^{+}	60	A_{5}	6_{5} 10_{3} 15_{2}		

== Full polyhedral groups ==
Full polyhedral groups
Weyl Schoe. (Orb.)	Coxeter notation	Order	Abstract structure	Coxeter number (h)	Mirrors (m)	Mirror diagrams	
Weyl Schoe. (Orb.)	Coxeter notation	Order	Abstract structure	Coxeter number (h)	Mirrors (m)	Orthogonal	Stereographic
A_{3} T_{d} (*332)	[3,3]	24	S_{4}	4	6		
B_{3} O_{h} (*432)	[4,3]	48	S_{4} × C_{2}	8	3 >6		
H_{3} I_{h} (*532)	[5,3]	120	A_{5} × C_{2}	10	15		

== See also ==
- Wythoff symbol
- List of spherical symmetry groups
