= Schoenflies notation =

Notation to represent symmetry in point groups

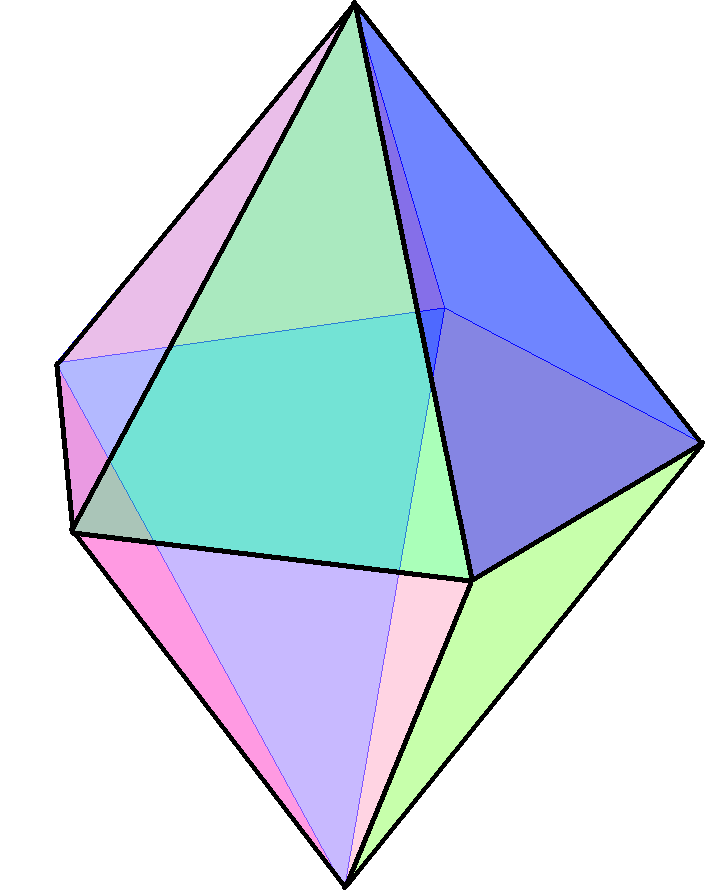
A pentagonal bipyramid and the Schoenflies notation that defines its symmetry: D_{5h} (a vertical quintuple axis of symmetry and a plane of horizontal symmetry equidistant from the two vertices)

The Schoenflies (or Schönflies) notation, named after the German mathematician Arthur Moritz Schoenflies, is a notation primarily used to specify point groups in three dimensions. Because a point group alone is completely adequate to describe the symmetry of a molecule, the notation is often sufficient and commonly used for spectroscopy. However, in crystallography, there is additional translational symmetry, and point groups are not enough to describe the full symmetry of crystals, so the full space group is usually used instead. The naming of full space groups usually follows another common convention, the Hermann–Mauguin notation, also known as the international notation.

Although Schoenflies notation without superscripts is a pure point group notation, optionally, superscripts can be added to further specify individual space groups. However, for space groups, the connection to the underlying symmetry elements is much more clear in Hermann–Mauguin notation, so the latter notation is usually preferred for space groups.

== Symmetry elements and operations ==
Three symmetry elements occur in a three dimensional space: a point in space through which spatial inversion takes place, a line in space about which rotational motion is defined, and a plane capable of reflecting one half of an object into the other. An element is a single point or a collection of points that do not move during symmetry transformations. Symmetry operations generate permutations of atoms when they move in relation to the symmetry elements and three basic operations are defined in relation to them. A central inversion operation usually given symbol i, a mirror reflection operation with symbol m or σ and a rotation operation n or C_{n} are the building blocks of molecular descriptions. Molecular symmetry can be completely defined by combinations of rotational motions together with either one of the reflection or inversion operations. By convention, the axis of proper rotation of greatest order is defined as the principal axis. All other symmetry elements are described in relation to it. Two very different systems are used to describe molecular and crystal symmetry. Schoenflies notation (1891) is largely based on mirror reflection while the more modern Hermann-Mauguin system (1931) has a structure based on inversion because X-ray crystallography adds an inversion centre. Unfortunately, Hermann-Maguin symbols are specially designed for the description of spatial translations in crystal structures and are unsuitable for molecular work.

The use of mirror reflection to describe symmetry introduces a number of problems that do not occur with spatial inversion. Mirror reflection is not a commutative operation so for rotational operation R the products Rm and mR generally produce different results while Ri and iR always produce the same result. Another problem with reflections is that they have to be defined in different planes so Schoenflies introduces vertical and diagonal mirror planes (containing the principal axis) denoted σ_{v} and σ_{d} with a horizontal mirror plane (perpendicular to the principal axis) denoted σ_{h}. In spite of these problems it is possible to describe symmetry as a combination of rotation and reflection in most cases. One exception to this scheme is the Schoenflies S series of point groups that are described is terms of combined rotational and reflection operations (rotation-reflection axes). C, D and S are usually followed by a subscript denoting the order of rotation applicable.

== Point groups ==
In three dimensions, there are an infinite number of point groups, but all of them can be classified by several families.

- C_{n} (for cyclic) has an n-fold rotation axis.
  - C_{nh} is C_{n} with the addition of a mirror (reflection) plane perpendicular to the axis of rotation (horizontal plane).
  - C_{nv} is C_{n} with the addition of n mirror planes containing the axis of rotation (vertical planes).
- C_{s} denotes a group with only mirror plane (for Spiegel, German for mirror) and no other symmetry elements.
- S_{n} (for Spiegel, German for mirror) contains only a n-fold rotation-reflection axis. The index, n, should be even because when it is odd an n-fold rotation-reflection axis is equivalent to a combination of an n-fold rotation axis and a perpendicular plane, hence S_{n} = C_{nh} for odd n.
- C_{ni} has only a rotoinversion axis. This notation is rarely used because any rotoinversion axis can be expressed instead as rotation-reflection axis: For odd n, C_{ni} = S_{2n} and C_{2ni} = S_{n} = C_{nh}, and for even n, C_{2ni} = S_{2n}. Only the notation C_{i} (meaning C_{1i}) is commonly used, and some sources write C_{3i}, C_{5i} etc.
- D_{n} (for dihedral, or two-sided) has an n-fold rotation axis plus n twofold axes perpendicular to that axis.
  - D_{nh} has, in addition, a horizontal mirror plane and, as a consequence, also n vertical mirror planes each containing the n-fold axis and one of the twofold axes.
  - D_{nd} has, in addition to the elements of D_{n}, n vertical mirror planes which pass between twofold axes (diagonal planes).
- T (the chiral tetrahedral group) has the rotation axes of a tetrahedron (three 2-fold axes and four 3-fold axes).
  - T_{d} includes diagonal mirror planes (each diagonal plane contains only one twofold axis and passes between two other twofold axes, as in D_{2d}). This addition of diagonal planes results in three improper rotation operations S_{4}.
  - T_{h} includes three horizontal mirror planes. Each plane contains two twofold axes and is perpendicular to the third twofold axis, which results in inversion center i.
- O (the chiral octahedral group) has the rotation axes of an octahedron or cube (three 4-fold axes, four 3-fold axes, and six diagonal 2-fold axes).
  - O_{h} includes horizontal mirror planes and, as a consequence, vertical mirror planes. It contains also inversion center and improper rotation operations.
- I (the chiral icosahedral group) indicates that the group has the rotation axes of an icosahedron or dodecahedron (six 5-fold axes, ten 3-fold axes, and 15 2-fold axes).
  - I_{h} includes horizontal mirror planes and contains also inversion center and improper rotation operations.

All groups that do not contain more than one higher-order axis (order 3 or more) can be arranged as shown in a table below; symbols in red are rarely used.

| | n = 1 | 2 | 3 | 4 | 5 | 6 | 7 | 8 | ... | ∞ |
|---|---|---|---|---|---|---|---|---|---|---|
| C_{n} | C_{1} | C_{2} | C_{3} | C_{4} | C_{5} | C_{6} | C_{7} | C_{8} | ... | C_{∞} |
| C_{nv} | C_{1v} = C_{1h} | C_{2v} | C_{3v} | C_{4v} | C_{5v} | C_{6v} | C_{7v} | C_{8v} | ... | C_{∞v} |
| C_{nh} | C_{1h} = C_{s} | C_{2h} | C_{3h} | C_{4h} | C_{5h} | C_{6h} | C_{7h} | C_{8h} | ... | C_{∞h} |
| S_{n} | S_{1} = C_{s} | S_{2} = C_{i} | S_{3} = C_{3h} | S_{4} | S_{5} = C_{5h} | S_{6} | S_{7} = C_{7h} | S_{8} | ... | S_{∞} = C_{∞h} |
| C_{ni} (redundant) | C_{1i} = C_{i} | C_{2i} = C_{s} | C_{3i} = S_{6} | C_{4i} = S_{4} | C_{5i} = S_{10} | C_{6i} = C_{3h} | C_{7i} = S_{14} | C_{8i} = S_{8} | ... | C_{∞i} = C_{∞h} |
| D_{n} | D_{1} = C_{2} | D_{2} | D_{3} | D_{4} | D_{5} | D_{6} | D_{7} | D_{8} | ... | D_{∞} |
| D_{nh} | D_{1h} = C_{2v} | D_{2h} | D_{3h} | D_{4h} | D_{5h} | D_{6h} | D_{7h} | D_{8h} | ... | D_{∞h} |
| D_{nd} | D_{1d} = C_{2h} | D_{2d} | D_{3d} | D_{4d} | D_{5d} | D_{6d} | D_{7d} | D_{8d} | ... | D_{∞d} = D_{∞h} |

In crystallography, due to the crystallographic restriction theorem, n is restricted to the values of 1, 2, 3, 4, or 6. The noncrystallographic groups are shown with grayed backgrounds. D_{4d} and D_{6d} are also forbidden because they contain improper rotations with n = 8 and 12 respectively. The 27 point groups in the table plus T, T_{d}, T_{h}, O and O_{h} constitute 32 crystallographic point groups.

Groups with n = ∞ are called limit groups or Curie groups. There are two more limit groups, not listed in the table: K (for Kugel, German for ball, sphere), the group of all rotations in 3-dimensional space; and K_{h}, the group of all rotations and reflections. In mathematics and theoretical physics they are known respectively as the special orthogonal group and the orthogonal group in three-dimensional space, with the symbols SO(3) and O(3).

== Space groups ==
The space groups with given point group are numbered by 1, 2, 3, ... (in the same order as their international number) and this number is added as a superscript to the Schönflies symbol for the corresponding point group. For example, groups numbers 3 to 5 whose point group is C_{2} have Schönflies symbols C^{1}_{2}, C^{2}_{2}, C^{3}_{2}.

While in case of point groups, Schönflies symbol defines the symmetry elements of group unambiguously, the additional superscript for space group doesn't have any information about translational symmetry of space group (lattice centering, translational components of axes and planes), hence one needs to refer to special tables, containing information about correspondence between Schönflies and Hermann–Mauguin notation. Such table is given in List of space groups page.

== See also ==
- Crystallographic point group
- Point groups in three dimensions
- List of spherical symmetry groups
