= Improper rotation =

Rotation composed with a reflection

In geometry, an improper rotation (also called rotation-reflection, rotoreflection, rotary reflection, or rotoinversion) is an isometry in Euclidean space that is a combination of a rotation about an axis and a reflection in a plane perpendicular to that axis. Reflection and inversion are each a special case of improper rotation. Any improper rotation is an affine transformation and, in cases that keep the coordinate origin fixed, a linear transformation. It is used as a symmetry operation in the context of geometric symmetry, molecular symmetry and crystallography, where an object that is unchanged by a combination of rotation and reflection is said to have improper rotation symmetry.

There is a distinction between rotary reflection and rotary inversion symmetry operations and their associated symmetry elements. Rotary reflections are generally used to describe the symmetry of individual molecules and are defined as a 360°/n rotation about an n-fold rotation axis followed by a reflection over a mirror plane perpendicular to the n-fold rotation axis. Rotoinversions are generally used to describe the symmetry of crystals and are defined as a 360°/n rotation about an n-fold rotation axis followed by an inversion through the origin. Although rotary reflection operations have a rotoinversion analogue and vice versa, rotoreflections and rotoinversions of the same order need not be identical. For example, a 6-fold rotoinversion axis and its associated with symmetry operations are distinct from those resulting from a 6-fold reflection axis.

Example polyhedra with rotoreflection symmetry
Group	S_{4}	S_{6}	S_{8}	S_{10}	S_{12}
Subgroups	C_{2}	C_{3}, S_{2} = C_{i}	C_{4}, C_{2}	C_{5}, S_{2} = C_{i}	C_{6}, S_{4}, C_{3}, C_{2}
Example	beveled digonal antiprism	triangular antiprism	square antiprism	pentagonal antiprism	hexagonal antiprism
Antiprisms with directed edges have rotoreflection symmetry. p-antiprisms for odd p contain inversion symmetry, C_{i}.

== Three dimensions ==
In 3 dimensions, improper rotation is equivalently defined as a combination of rotation about an axis and inversion in a point on the axis. For this reason it is also called a rotoinversion or rotary inversion. The two definitions are equivalent because rotation by an angle θ followed by reflection is the same transformation as rotation by θ + 180° followed by inversion (taking the point of inversion to be in the plane of reflection). In both definitions, the operations commute.

A three-dimensional symmetry that has only one fixed point is necessarily an improper rotation.

An improper rotation of an object thus produces a rotation of its mirror image. The axis is called the rotation-reflection axis. This is called an n-fold improper rotation if the angle of rotation, before or after reflexion, is 360°/n (where n must be even). There are several different systems for naming individual improper rotations:

- In the Schoenflies notation the symbol S_{n} (German, Spiegel, for mirror), where n must be even, denotes the symmetry group generated by an n-fold improper rotation. For example, the symmetry operation S_{6} is the combination of a rotation of (360°/6)=60° and a mirror plane reflection. (This should not be confused with the same notation for symmetric groups).
- In Hermann–Mauguin notation the symbol n̅ is used for an n-fold rotoinversion; i.e., rotation by an angle of rotation of 360°/n with inversion. If n is even it must be divisible by 4. (Note that 2̅ would be simply a reflection, and is normally denoted "m", for "mirror".) When n is odd this corresponds to a 2n-fold improper rotation (or rotary reflexion).
- The Coxeter notation for S_{2n} is [2n^{+},2^{+}] and, as an index 4 subgroup of [2n,2],, generated as the product of 3 reflections.
- The Orbifold notation is n×, order 2n.
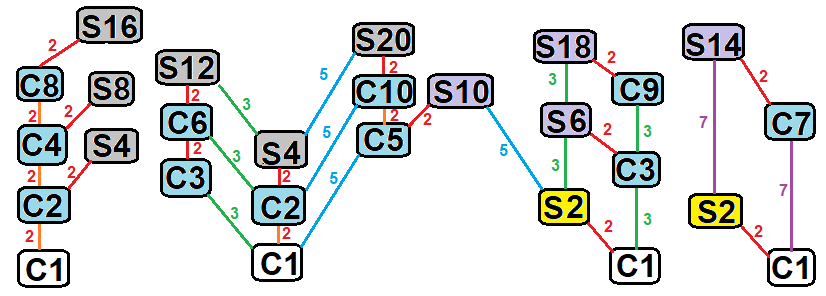
  Subgroups for S_{2} to S_{20}. C_{1} is the identity group. S_{2} is the central inversion. C_{n} are cyclic groups.

=== Subgroups ===
- The direct subgroup of S_{2n} is C_{n}, order n, index 2, being the rotoreflection generator applied twice.
- For odd n, S_{2n} contains an inversion, denoted C_{i} or S_{2}. S_{2n} is the direct product: S_{2n} = C_{n} × S_{2}, if n is odd.
- For any n, if odd p is a divisor of n, then S_{2n/p} is a subgroup of S_{2n}, index p. For example S_{4} is a subgroup of S_{12}, index 3.

== As an indirect isometry ==
In a wider sense, an improper rotation may be defined as any indirect isometry; i.e., an element of E(3)\E^{+}(3): thus it can also be a pure reflection in a plane, or have a glide plane. An indirect isometry is an affine transformation with an orthogonal matrix that has a determinant of −1.

A proper rotation is an ordinary rotation. In the wider sense, a proper rotation is defined as a direct isometry; i.e., an element of E^{+}(3): it can also be the identity, a rotation with a translation along the axis, or a pure translation. A direct isometry is an affine transformation with an orthogonal matrix that has a determinant of 1.

In either the narrower or the wider senses, the composition of two improper rotations is a proper rotation, and the composition of an improper and a proper rotation is an improper rotation.

== Physical systems ==
When studying the symmetry of a physical system under an improper rotation (e.g., if a system has a mirror symmetry plane), it is important to distinguish between vectors and pseudovectors (as well as scalars and pseudoscalars, and in general between tensors and pseudotensors), since the latter transform differently under proper and improper rotations (in 3 dimensions, pseudovectors are invariant under inversion).

== See also ==
- Isometry
- Orthogonal group
