= Color and Symmetry =

1971 mathematics book by Arthur L. Loeb

- Cover of the 1971 hardback edition
- Author: Arthur L. Loeb
- Subject: Dichromatic symmetry, polychromatic symmetry
- Publisher: Wiley Interscience
- Publication date: 1971
- Media type: Print
- Pages: 179
- ISBN: 978-0-471-54335-0

Color and Symmetry is a book by Arthur L. Loeb published by Wiley Interscience in 1971. The author adopts an unconventional algorithmic approach to generating the line and plane groups based on the concept of "rotocenter" (the invariant point of a rotation). He then introduces the concept of two or more colors to derive all of the plane dichromatic symmetry groups and some of the polychromatic symmetry groups.

== Structure and topics ==
The book is divided into three parts. In the first part, chapters 1–7, the author introduces his "algorismic" (algorithmic) method based on "rotocenters" and "rotosimplexes" (a set of congruent rotocenters). He then derives the 7 frieze groups and the 17 wallpaper groups.

In the second part, chapters 8–10, the dichromatic (black-and-white, two-colored) patterns are introduced and the 17 dichromatic line groups and the 46 black-and-white dichromatic plane groups are derived.

In the third part, chapters 11–22, polychromatic patterns (3 or more colors), polychromatic line groups, and polychromatic plane groups are derived and illustrated. Loeb's synthetic approach does not enable a comparison of colour symmetry concepts and definitions by other authors, and it is therefore not surprising that the number of polychromatic patterns he identifies are different from that published elsewhere.

== Audience ==
Unusually, the author does not state the target audience for his book; his publisher, in their dust jacket blurb, say "Color and Symmetry will be of primary interest on the one hand to crystallographers, chemists, material scientists, and mathematicians. On the other hand, this volume will serve the interests of those active in the fields of design, visual and environmental studies and architecture."

Only a school-level mathematical background is required to follow the author's logical development of his argument. Group theory is not used in the book, which is beneficial to readers without this specific mathematical background, but it makes some of the material more long-winded than it would be if it had been developed using standard group theory.

Michael Holt in his review for Leonardo said: "In this erudite and handsomely presented monograph, then, designers should find a rich source of explicit rules for pattern-making and mathematicians and crystallographers a welcome and novel slant on symmetry operations with colours."

== Reception ==
The book had a generally positive reception from contemporary reviewers. W.E. Klee in a review for Acta Crystallographica wrote: "Color and Symmetry will surely stimulate new interest in colour symmetries and will be of special interest to crystallographers. People active in design may also profit from this book." D.M. Brink in a review for Physics Bulletin published by the Institute of Physics said: "The book will be useful to workers with a technical interest in periodic structures and also to more general readers who are fascinated by symmetrical patterns. The illustrations encourage the reader to understand the mathematical structure underlying the patterns."

J.D.H. Donney in a review for Physics Today said: "This book should prove useful to physicists, chemists, crystallographers (of course), but also to decorators and designers, from textiles to ceramics. It will be enjoyed, not only by mathematicians, but by all lovers of orderliness, logic and beauty." David Harker in a review for Science said: "It may well be that this work will become a classic essay on planar color symmetry."

== Criticism ==
The author's idiosyncratic approach was not adopted by researchers in the field, and later assessments of Loeb's contribution to color symmetry were more critical of his work than earlier reviewers had been. Marjorie Senechal said that Loeb's work on polychromatic patterns, whilst not wrong, imposed artificial restrictions which meant that some valid colored patterns with three or more colors were excluded from his lists.

R.L.E. Schwarzenberger in 1980 said: "The study of colour symmetry has been bedevilled by a lack of precise definitions when the number of colours is greater than two ... it is unfortunate that this paper was apparently ignored by Shubnikov and Loeb whose books give incomplete and unsystematic listings." In a 1984 review paper Schwarzenberger remarks: "... these authors [including Loeb] confine themselves to a restricted class of colour group ... for N > 2 the effect is to dramatically limit the number of colour groups considered."

Branko Grünbaum and G.C. Shephard in their book Tilings and patterns gave an assessment of previous work in the field. Commenting on Color and Symmetry they said:"Loeb gives an original, interesting and satisfactory account of the 2-color groups ... unfortunately when discussing multicolor patterns, Loeb restricts the admissible color changes so severely that he obtains a total of only 54 periodic k-color configurations with k ≥ 3." Later authors determined that the total number of k-color configurations with 3 ≤ k ≤ 12 is 751.
