= Colored Symmetry =

1964 book by A.V. Shubnikov and N.V. Belov

- Cover of the 1964 paperback edition
- Editor: William T. Holser
- Author: A. V. Shubnikov and N. V. Belov
- Translator: Jack Itzkoff and Jack Gollob
- Language: English
- Subject: Dichromatic symmetry, polychromatic symmetry
- Publisher: Pergamon Press
- Publication date: 1964
- Media type: Print
- Pages: 263
- OCLC: 530340
- Text: Colored Symmetry at Internet Archive

Colored Symmetry is a book by A.V. Shubnikov and N.V. Belov and published by Pergamon Press in 1964. The book contains translations of materials originally written in Russian and published between 1951 and 1958. The book was notable because it gave English-language speakers access to new work in the fields of dichromatic and polychromatic symmetry.

== Structure and topics ==
The book is divided into two parts. The first part is a translation into English of A.V. Shubnikov's book Symmetry and antisymmetry of finite figures (Russian: Симметрия и антисимметрия конечных фигур) originally published in 1951. As the editor says in his preface, this book rekindled interest in the field of antisymmetry after a break of 20 years. The book defines symmetry elements, operations and groups; it then introduces the concept of antisymmetry, and derives the full set of dichromatic three-dimensional point groups. A paper entitled Antisymmetry of textures is appended to part 1; it analyzes the antisymmetry of groups containing infinity-fold axes.

The second part, entitled Infinite groups of colored symmetry, consists of translations of six papers by N.V. Belov and his co-workers in the new field of polychromatic symmetry. These papers cover the derivation of the 42 magnetic Bravais lattices and the 1651 magnetic space groups, the 46 dichromatic plane groups, mosaics for the 46 dichromatic plane groups, one-dimensional infinite crystallographic groups, polychromatic plane groups, and three-dimensional mosaics with colored symmetry.

== Audience ==
The book is written for crystallographers, mathematicians and physics researchers who are interested in the application of color symmetry to crystal structure analysis and physics experiments involving magnetic or ferroelectric materials.

== Reception ==
The book had a mixed reception from reviewers. Allen Nussbaum in American Scientist praised the editor for constructing a consistent story from the original works, but criticised the papers in part two for being difficult to read. G.S. Pawley in a review for Science Progress gave credit to the editor for adding the international notation next to the authors' "retrograde personal notation". However, he criticised claims that the book is a "valuable reference book" as being "optimistic". Martin Buerger in an extensive review for Science also offered both praise and criticism. He stated that previous work in the field by William Barlow and H.J. Woods is not given sufficient credit by the authors and is largely missing from the, otherwise full, bibliography. He praised Shubnikov's book (part 1) as being "very clearly written, well illustrated, and easy to understand", but criticised Belov's papers in part 2 because they "lack a central unifying theme." R.J. Davis in a brief review in Mineralogical Magazine said "this book is therefore unique in English and forms an essential introduction to modern developments in symmetry theory."

== Influence ==
In later reviews of the literature by R.L.E. Schwarzenberger and by Branko Grünbaum and G.C. Shephard in their book Tilings and patterns the work of the Russian color symmetry school led by A.V. Shubnikov and N.V. Belov was put into its proper historical context. Schwarzenberger, and Grünbaum and Shephard, give credit to Shubnikov and Belov for relaunching the field of color symmetry after the work of Heinrich Heesch and H.J. Woods in the 1930s was largely ignored. However, they criticise Shubnikov and Belov for taking a crystallographic rather than a group-theoretic approach, and for using their own confusing notation rather than adopting the international standard Hermann–Mauguin notation for crystallographic symmetry elements.
