= Symmetry in Science and Art =

1974 book by A.V. Shubnikov and V.A. Koptsik

- Cover of the 1974 hardback edition
- Editor: David Harker
- Author: A.V. Shubnikov and V.A. Koptsik
- Translator: G.D. Archard
- Subject: Dichromatic symmetry, polychromatic symmetry
- Publisher: Plenum Press
- Publication date: 1974
- Media type: Print
- Pages: 420
- ISBN: 978-0-306-30759-1
- LC Class: Q172.5.S95S4913
- Text: Symmetry in Science and Art at Internet Archive

Symmetry in Science and Art is a book by A.V. Shubnikov and V.A. Koptsik published by Plenum Press in 1974. The book is a translation of Simmetrija v nauke i iskusstve (Russian: Симметрия в науке и искусстве) published by Nauka in 1972. The book was notable because it gave English-language speakers access to Russian work in the fields of dichromatic and polychromatic symmetry.

== Structure and topics ==
The book is divided into two parts. The first part is an updated version of A.V. Shubnikov's 1940 book Symmetry: laws of symmetry and their application in science, technology and applied arts (Russian: Симметрия : законы симметрии и их применение в науке, технике и прикладном искусстве). The following types of classical (one-color) and dichromatic (two-color) symmetries are covered in the first part of the book: one-sided rosettes, figures with a singular point, one-sided bands, two-sided bands, rods, network patterns, layers and space groups.

The second part consists of three new chapters written by V.A. Koptsik covering the following subjects: group theory, crystallographic groups, antisymmetry, colored symmetry, symmetry in science and art, and conservation laws.

== Audience ==
The book is written for crystallographers, mathematicians and physicists who are interested in the application of color symmetry to crystal structure analysis and physics experiments involving magnetic or ferroelectric materials. Werner Nowacki in his review of the book for Science stated: "This is an extraordinary book, dealing with symmetry in all its aspects and written for the nonspecialist as well as the specialist (crystallographer and physicist) in this domain of natural sciences."

== Reception ==
The book had a mixed reception from contemporary reviewers. Marc H. Bornstein in a review for Leonardo praised the book: "Shubnikov and Koptsik, I find, should stand beside Weyl's classic treatise, Symmetry". Werner Nowacki wrote a positive review: "This clearly written, beautifully illustrated book will become a standard work for all who are interested in unifying branches of natural sciences and of art, and we must be grateful to the translator, the editor, and the publisher for having produced such a precious publication."

However, Herbert Callen in American Scientist, criticised the book:"The book remains as it was in its original edition - an exhaustive classification of symmetry groups for systems with particular types of symmetry operations, now updated by Koptsik. The larger philosophical and aesthetic extensions, however, do not meet Western standards of critical accuracy, rigour, or precision of statement; they are not pursued in any depth, and they draw on no currents of thought outside the Soviet Union."

== Influence ==
Tony Crilly, when reviewing Jaswon and Rose's Crystal symmetry, theory of colour crystallography in The Mathematical Gazette in 1984 commented: "The beginning student would find Symmetry in Science and Art (by A. V. Shubnikov and V. A. Koptsick, 1974) a stimulating introduction to the ideas worked out in technical detail by Jaswon and Rose." István and Magdolna Hargittai in the preface to their book Symmetry through the eyes of a chemist remarked: "We would like especially to note here two classics in the literature of symmetry which have strongly influenced us: Weyl's Symmetry and Shubnikov and Koptsik's Symmetry in Science and Art".

In later reviews of the literature by R.L.E. Schwarzenberger and by Branko Grünbaum and G.C. Shephard in their book Tilings and patterns the work of the Russian color symmetry school led by A.V. Shubnikov and N.V. Belov was put into its proper historical context. Schwarzenberger, and Grünbaum and Shephard, give credit to Shubnikov and Belov for relaunching the field of color symmetry after the work of Heinrich Heesch and H.J. Woods in the 1930s was largely ignored. However, they criticise Shubnikov and Koptsik for taking a crystallographic rather than a group-theoretic approach, and for continuing to use their own confusing notation rather than adopting the international standard Hermann–Mauguin notation for crystallographic symmetry elements.
