= Multiple antisymmetry =

Multiple two-valued symmetry operations

In crystallography and materials science multiple antisymmetry is the concept of a substance possessing two or more different types of antisymmetry simultaneously. Multiple antisymmetry has applications in the fields of magnetic structures, ferroelectricity, and the physical properties of crystals.

== Antisymmetry ==
Antisymmetry operation $1'\text{; } (1')^2 {{=}} 1$

Antisymmetry is a symmetry operation which reverses an object to its opposite. A more precise definition is "operations of antisymmetry transform objects possessing two possible values of a given property from one value to the other."

An antisymmetry can be any two-valued operation which, if executed twice, returns the object to its original state. In the 1930s the first use of an antisymmetry operation was dichromatic symmetry or black-white symmetry. In 1951 Landau and Lifshitz reinterpreted black and white colours to correspond to time-reversal symmetry.

A wide variety of antisymmetries are now recognized, with three new antisymmetries having been discovered since 2010.

Two-valued symmetries (antisymmetries)
| Antisymmetry | Transformation | Symbol | Refs. |
|---|---|---|---|
| Black-white (2-colour) | $\square \rightarrow \blacksquare$ | $1'$ | |
| Space inversion | $\mathit{r} \rightarrow - \mathit{r}$ | $\overline{1}$ | |
| Time-reversal | $t \rightarrow - t$ | $\tau$ or $1'$ | |
| Charge-reversal | $e \rightarrow - e$ | $+ -$ or $1'$ | |
| Magnetic moment | $\mathbf{m} \rightarrow - \mathbf{m}$ | $\uparrow \downarrow$ or $1'$ | |
| Rotation-reversal | $\Phi \rightarrow - \Phi$ | $1^\Phi$ | |
| Distortion-reversal | $\lambda \rightarrow - \lambda$ | $1^*$ | |
| Wedge reversion | $\mathbf{v}_1 \wedge \mathbf{v}_2 \rightarrow \mathbf{v}_2 \wedge \mathbf{v}_1$ | $1^\dagger$ | |

A symmetry operation which interchanges three or more colours is not an antisymmetry but rather a polychromatic or colour symmetry.

== Multiple antisymmetry ==
Combination of two antisymmetries

Combination of three antisymmetries (cyan, magenta and yellow)

If two different antisymmetry operations are defined (for example $1'$ and $1^*$) they can be used to generate double antisymmetry groups.

Where there are $l$ different types of antisymmetry operations the total number of antisymmetry combinations is $2^l -1$. The table below lists the total number of point groups and space groups in 3D for 0, 1, 2, 3 and 4 different types of antisymmetries.

Multiple antisymmetry groups
| Group | $l$ | Symbol | Number | Refs. |
|---|---|---|---|---|
| Point groups in 3D | 0 | $G_{30}$ | 32 | |
| Point groups in 3D | 1 | $G_{30}^1$ | 122 | |
| Point groups in 3D | 2 | $G_{30}^2$ | 624 | |
| Point groups in 3D | 3 | $G_{30}^3$ | 4362 | |
| Point groups in 3D | 4 | $G_{30}^4$ | 42244 | |
| Space groups in 3D | 0 | $G_{3}$ | 230 | |
| Space groups in 3D | 1 | $G_{3}^1$ | 1651 | |
| Space groups in 3D | 2 | $G_{3}^2$ | 17803 | |
| Space groups in 3D | 3 | $G_{3}^3$ | 287574 | |
| Space groups in 3D | 4 | $G_{3}^4$ | 6880800 | |

== Applications ==
Simultaneously with the theoretical investigations of A. M. Zamorzaev, practical applications of double antisymmetry were being pursued by other Russian researchers such as B. A. Tavger, B. K. Vainshtein and L. A. Shuvalov.

In 1962 Shuvalov and N. V. Belov used two different types of antisymmetry to describe the combination of ferromagnetic and ferroelectric properties of crystals. This field is now termed multiferroics, and has been an intensive area of research since 2000. Magnetochromism is a related field in which magnetic moment and black-white antisymmetries are combined.

Space-time reversal (inverting both space and time coordinates, signified by $\overline{1}$$'$) was discussed by Yu. I. Sirotin and M. P. Shaskolskaya in 1982, and was used to derive the ferroelectric space groups in 1986. Antiparticle conjugation is related to space-time reversal.

The combination of space reversal and magnetic reversal was studied by Vojtěch Kopský in 2006.

Rotation-reversal space groups have been used in the classification of tilted octahedra perovskites.

== History ==
The first suggestion of the concept of multiple antisymmetry (Note: Multiple antisymmetry was referred to as "generalized antisymmetry" and "different kinds of antisymmetry" by the early Russian authors.) was in a 1944 paper by Alexei Vasilievich Shubnikov. The field was developed by Alexander Mihailovich Zamorzaev and his research group at Moldova State University.

=== 1950s to 1970s ===
In 1957 Zamorzaev and Sokolov introduced the concept of more than one kind of two-valued antisymmetry operation (multiple antisymmetry) and derived the crystallographic (finite) point groups with one or more types of antisymmetry. In 1958 Zamorzaev derived the space groups with two types of antisymmetry. From 1960–63 Zamorzaev and his co-workers derived the two-dimensional (planar) groups with two or three types of antisymmetry, the point groups with three types of antisymmetry, and the layer groups with two types of antisymmetry. In 1963 Shuvalov derived the limit groups of double antisymmetry.

From 1964–1965 Zamorzaev derived the similarity groups with two or three types of antisymmetry, the layer groups with two to five types of antisymmetry, the groups of borders and ribbons (Note: A border is a two-dimensional figure infinite in one direction (or a 2-sided line); a ribbon is a figure in a layer infinite in one direction (a 2-sided border, or a 4-sided line).) with two or three types of antisymmetry, the space groups with three to six types of antisymmetry, one- and two-sided rosettes, and finite borders and ribbons with two to four types of antisymmetry, and rod groups with two to four types of antisymmetry.

In 1967 Zamorzaev derived the two-dimensional groups with colour antisymmetry of two different types, and introduced the concept of quasisymmetry (P-symmetry). (Note: In P-symmetry it is assumed that a geometric figure π with isometry group G is coloured so that each element of G effects a unique permutation of the colours.) P-symmetry is a type of generalized symmetry where P represents a permutation group acting on a set of indices. In 1980 Alexandru Lungu, one of Zamorzaev's students, introduced Q-symmetry. Q-symmetry is a type of generalized symmetry which involves transformations on weighted figures and is based on subgroups of semidirect products. Lungu went on to introduce W_{p} and W_{q} symmetries based on wreath products. In 1982 Vojtěch Kopský showed that Q- and W_{q}-symmetries can be reduced to P- and W_{p}-symmetries. A few papers on multiple antisymmetry were also published by non-Russian authors.

Reviews of the field were published by Koptsik, Zamorzaev, and Shubnikov and Koptsik. Books summarizing the work of the Zamorzaev school were published in the 1970s and 1980s in Russian.

At the end of the 1970s the Russian research entered a period of diminishing returns, as the complexity of the results increased, but the usefulness of the results decreased. In practice, a single type of antisymmetry was a useful concept in explaining experimental results in a wide variety of physical fields. Two types of antisymmetry were rarely required to explain a physical result, and three or more types of antisymmetry were not required in practice.

=== 1980s to 1990s ===
From the mid-1980s to the mid-2000s Slavik Vlado Jablan worked in the field of multiple antisymmetry. In 1986 Jablan defined a method of generating antisymmetry groups using the new concept of "antisymmetric characteristic". Vojtěch Kopský criticised the paper in Mathematical Reviews: "The latter concept is not clearly defined and theorems are given without proof, which makes it hard to follow the logic of the paper."

Jablan followed up with a long series of papers cataloguing multiple antisymmetry groups using his new antisymmetric characteristic method. These papers were critically reviewed in Mathematical Reviews.

Where initially the major workers in the field (Zamorzaev, Palistrant, Jablan) had papers published in major journals such Acta Crystallographica and Zeitschrift für Kristallographie, their later papers were mostly published in minor journals. By 1992, in a review of one of Zamorzaev and Palistrant's papers, Vojtěch Kopský (one of the two editors of the International Tables for Crystallography Volume E: Subperiodic groups) commented: "The text is in narrative style and makes the impression that its aim is to promote the subject rather than to develop a consistent mathematical scheme. As usual, there are statements about the importance of the subject in physics, and this time there is a claim of contributions to the advance of crystallography in arbitrary dimensions. ... In the reviewer's opinion, for what it is worth, the whole subject is a dead branch of symmetry theory."

=== 2000s to 2020s ===
From the mid-1980s Daniel B. Litvin published extensively on magnetic space groups and later worked on multiple antisymmetry.

In the 2010s a new group of researchers entered the field including Ismaila Dabo, Venkatraman Gopalan, Mantao Huang, Vincent S. Liu, Jason M. Munro, Brian K. VanLeeuwen, and Haricharan Padmanabhan. They built on Litvin's work and published papers on new types of antisymmetries, such as rotation-reversal, distortion-reversal. and wedge reversion.
