= Alexander Mihailovich Zamorzaev =

Russian mathematician and crystallographer

- Born: January 27, 1927
- Died: November 1, 1997 (aged 70)
- Education: University of Leningrad
- Scientific career
- Institutions: University of Kishinev (Chișinău)
- Thesis: Theory of Antisymmetry and its Different Generalizations (1971)
- Academic advisors: A.D. Aleksandrov

Alexander Mihailovich Zamorzaev (Russian: Александр Михайлович Заморзаев; 27 January 1927 – 1 November 1997) was a Soviet mathematician and crystallographer. In 1953 Zamorzaev was the first to derive the complete list of magnetic space groups (Shubnikov groups). In 1957 Zamorzaev founded the field of generalised antisymmetry by introducing the concept of more than one kind of two-valued antisymmetry operation (multiple antisymmetry).

== Life ==
=== Career ===
Zamorzaev was born on 23 January 1927 in Leningrad. In 1953 at the University of Leningrad, under the supervision of A.D. Aleksandrov, he gained the M.A. degree with the dissertation Generalization of Fedorov groups, in which he developed the general theory of antisymmetry. In this work he derived for the first time the 1651 antisymmetry space groups, and named them "Shubnikov groups", after A.V. Shubnikov the pioneer of antisymmetry.

In 1953 he became a mathematics lecturer at the newly opened University of Kishinev (Chișinău). Besides teaching the regular mathematics curriculum, and supervising graduate students, Zamorzaev devised and taught new courses in the areas of discrete geometry, theoretical crystallography, and antisymmetry and its generalisations.

In 1971 he gained his doctoral degree with a thesis entitled Theory of Antisymmetry and its Different Generalizations. The thesis was based on his new theories of geometry and mathematical crystallography, 1) multiple antisymmetry; 2) similarity and conformal symmetry; and 3) P-symmetry, including generalisations of A. V. Shubnikov's antisymmetry and N. V. Belov's color symmetry.

In 1973 a department of higher geometry was established within the university and Zamorzaev was appointed as professor and head of the department. A history of the personnel and achievements of Zamorzaev's school of geometry is available online.

=== Works ===
The majority of Zamorzaev's works were published in Russian. Books published by Zamorzaev:

- Theory of simple and multiple antisymmetry (1976)
- Theory of discrete symmetry groups (1977)
- Color symmetry, its generalizations and applications (1978)
- P-symmetry and its further development (1986)

Zamorzaev published 110 papers. Selected papers available in English:

- Similarity symmetric and antisymmetric groups (1964).
- Quasisymmetry (p-symmetry) groups (1968)
- Color-symmetry space groups (1969)
- Antisymmetry, its generalizations and geometrical applications (1980)
- Generalized antisymmetry (1988).

=== Honours and awards ===
- E. S. Fedorov Prize of the Russian Academy of Sciences for his contributions to the theory of symmetry (1973)
- State Prize of the Moldovan SSR in Science and Technology for his contributions in the field of discrete geometry (1974)
- Honored Worker of Science of the Moldovan SSR for his achievements in science and education (1977)
- Elected Corresponding Member of the Academy of Sciences of Moldova (1989)
