= Slavik Vlado Jablan =

Serbian mathematician and crystallographer

- Born: June 10, 1952
- Died: February 26, 2015 (aged 62)
- Education: University of Belgrade
- Scientific career
- Workplaces: University of Niš, Mathematical Institute of the Serbian Academy of Sciences and Arts
- Thesis: Theory of Simple and Multiple Antisymmetry in E2 and E2\{O} (1984)
- Doctoral advisor: Neda Bokan

Slavik Vlado Jablan (Serbian: Славик Владо Јаблан; 10 June 1952 – 26 February 2015) was a Serbian mathematician and crystallographer. Jablan is known for his contributions to antisymmetry, knot theory, the theory of symmetry and ornament, and ethnomathematics.

== Career ==
Jablan was born on 10 June 1952 in Sarajevo. Jablan graduated in mathematics from the University of Belgrade (1977), where he also gained his M.A. degree (1981) and Ph.D. degree (1984) with the dissertation Theory of Simple and Multiple Antisymmetry in E2 and E2\{O}. He was a Fulbright scholar in 2003/4. Jablan was a professor of geometry at the University of Niš until 1999; subsequently he was a researcher at the Mathematical Institute of the Serbian Academy of Sciences and Arts.

Jablan established the online journal VisMath in 2005 and was its editor from its inception until 2014. He joined the editorial board of the journal Symmetry in 2009 and was editor-in-chief from 2012 until 2015. After his death the journal printed a 14-page obituary. Journal of Knot Theory and Its Ramifications printed a special issue in his memory in 2016.

== Works ==
Books published by Jablan:

- Theory of symmetry and ornament (1995)
- Symmetry, ornament and modularity (2002)
- LinKnot: knot theory by computer (2007)

Jablan published 65 academic papers. Selected papers available in English:

Antisymmetry and coloured symmetry:

- Groups of conformal antisymmetry and complex antisymmetry In E2\{0} (1985)
- A new method of generating plane groups of simple and multiple antisymmetry (1986)
- Enantiomorphism of antisymmetric figures (1986)
- Colored antisymmetry (1992)
- Farbgruppen and their place in the history of colored symmetry (2007)

Knot theory:

- Nonplanar graphs derived from Gauss codes of virtual knots and links (2011)
- Knots in art (2012)
- Delta diagrams (2016)

Ornament and ethnomathematics:

- Antisymmetry and modularity in ornamental art (2001)
- Elementary constructions of Persian mosaics (2006)
- Knots and links in architecture (2012)
