= Dichromatic symmetry =

Two-colour symmetry (examples, history and dimensional counts)

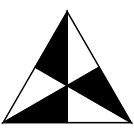
Dichromatic triangle illustrating colour symmetry

Dichromatic symmetry – also called antisymmetry, black-and-white symmetry, magnetic symmetry, counterchange symmetry, or dichroic symmetry – is a symmetry operation which reverses an object to its opposite. A more precise definition is "operations of antisymmetry transform objects possessing two possible values of a given property from one value to the other." Dichromatic symmetry refers specifically to two-coloured symmetry; this can be extended to three or more colours in which case it is termed polychromatic symmetry. A general term for dichromatic and polychromatic symmetry is simply colour symmetry. Dichromatic symmetry is used to describe magnetic crystals and in other areas of physics, such as time reversal, which require two-valued symmetry operations.

== Examples ==
A simple example is to take a white object, such as a triangle, and apply a colour change resulting in a black triangle. Applying the colour change once more yields the original white triangle.

Anti-identity operation and Cayley table

The colour change, here termed an anti-identity operation (1'), yields the identity operation (1) if performed twice.

Another example is to construct an anti-mirror reflection (m') from a mirror reflection (m) and an anti-identity operation (1') executed in either order.

The m' operation can then be used to construct the antisymmetry point group 3m' of a dichromatic triangle.

The six operations making up the dichromatic D3 (3m') point group

D3 Cayley table with colour change representing the antisymmetry group 3m'

There are no mirror reflection (m) operations for the dichromatic triangle, as there would be if all the smaller component triangles were coloured white. However, by introducing the anti-mirror reflection (m') operation the full dihedral D3 symmetry is restored. The six operations making up the dichromatic D3 (3m') point group are:

- identity (e)
- rotation by 2π/3 (r)
- rotation by 4π/3 (r^{2})
- anti-mirror reflection (m')
- combination of m' with r (m'r)
- combination of m' with r^{2} (m'r^{2}).

Note that the vertex numbers do not form part of the triangle being operated on - they are shown to keep track of where the vertices end up after each operation.

== History ==
In 1930 Heinrich Heesch was the first person to formally postulate an antisymmetry operation in the context of examining the 3D space groups in 4D. Heesch's work was influenced by Weber's 1929 paper on black-and-white colouring of 2D bands.

In 1935–1936 H.J. Woods published a series of four papers with the title The geometrical basis of pattern design. The last of these was devoted to counterchange symmetry and in which was derived for the first time the 46 dichromatic 2D point groups.

The work of Heesch and Woods were not influential at the time, and the subject of dichromatic symmetry did not start to become important until the publication of A.V. Shubnikov's book Symmetry and antisymmetry of finite figures in 1951. Thereafter the subject developed rapidly, initially in Russia but subsequently in many other countries, because of its importance in magnetic structures and other physical fields.

- 1951 Landau and Lifshitz reinterpret black and white colours to correspond to time reversal symmetry
- 1952 W. Cochran re-derives the 46 dichromatic 2D point groups quoting the previous work of Alexander and Herrmann (1928–9) and Woods 1935
- 1953 Zamorzaev derives the 1651 3D antisymmetric space groups for the first time
- 1956 Tavger and Zaitsev use the concept of vector reversal of magnetic moments to derive point groups for magnetic crystals
- 1957 Belov and his colleagues independently derive the 2D and 3D antisymmetric groups
- 1957 Zamorzaev and Sokolov begin the generalization of antisymmetry by introducing the concept of more than one kind of two-valued antisymmetry operation
- 1957 Mackay publishes the first review of the Russian work in English. Subsequent reviews were published by Holser (1961), Koptsik (1968), Schwarzenberger (1984), in Grünbaum and Shephard's Tilings and patterns (1987), and Brückler and Stilinović (2024)
- Late 1950s M.C. Escher's artworks based on dichromatic and polychromatic patterns popularise colour symmetry amongst scientists
- 1961 Clear definition by van der Waerden and Burckhardt of colour symmetry in terms of group theory, regardless of the number of colours or dimensions involved
- 1964 First publication of Shubnikov and Belov's Colored Symmetry in English translation
- 1965 Wladyslaw Opechowski and Rosalia Guccione provide a complete derivation and enumeration of the dichromatic 3D space groups
- 1966 Publication by Koptsik of the complete atlas of dichromatic 3D space groups (in Russian)
- 1971 Derivation by Loeb of 2D colour symmetry configurations using rotocenters
- 1974 Publication of Symmetry in Science and Art by Shubnikov and Koptsik with extensive coverage of dichromatic symmetry in 1D, 2D and 3D
- 1988 Washburn and Crowe apply colour symmetry analysis to cultural patterns and objects
- 2008 Conway, Burgiel and Goodman-Strauss publish The Symmetries of Things which describes the colour-preserving symmetries of coloured objects using a new notation based on Orbifolds

== Dimensional counts ==
The table below gives the number of ordinary and dichromatic groups by dimension. The Bohm symbol $G_{ol}^a$ is used to denote the number of groups where $o$ = overall dimension, $l$ = lattice dimension and $a$ = number of antisymmetry operation types. $a = 1$ for dichromatic groups with a single antisymmetry operation .

| Overall dimension | Lattice dimension | Ordinary groups | | | | Dichromatic groups | | |
| Overall dimension | Lattice dimension | Name | Symbol | Count | Refs | Symbol | Count | Refs |
|---|---|---|---|---|---|---|---|---|
| 0 | 0 | Zero-dimensional symmetry group | $G_0$ | 1 | | $G_0^1$ | 2 | |
| 1 | 0 | One-dimensional point groups | $G_{10}$ | 2 | | $G_{10}^1$ | 5 | |
| 1 | 1 | One-dimensional discrete symmetry groups | $G_1$ | 2 | | $G_1^1$ | 7 | |
| 2 | 0 | Two-dimensional point groups (rosettes) | $G_{20}$ | 10 | | $G_{20}^1$ | 31 | |
| 2 | 1 | Frieze (strip) groups | $G_{21}$ | 7 | | $G_{21}^1$ | 31 | |
| 2 | 2 | Wallpaper (plane) groups | $G_2$ | 17 | | $G_2^1$ | 80 | |
| 3 | 0 | Three-dimensional point groups | $G_{30}$ | 32 | | $G_{30}^1$ | 122 | |
| 3 | 1 | Rod (cylinder) groups | $G_{31}$ | 75 | | $G_{31}^1$ | 394 | |
| 3 | 2 | Layer (sheet) groups | $G_{32}$ | 80 | | $G_{32}^1$ | 528 | |
| 3 | 3 | Three-dimensional space groups | $G_{3}$ | 230 | | $G_{3}^1$ | 1651 | |
| 4 | 0 | Four-dimensional point groups | $G_{40}$ | 271 | | $G_{40}^1$ | 1202 | |
| 4 | 1 | | $G_{41}$ | 343 | | | | |
| 4 | 2 | | $G_{42}$ | 1091 | | | | |
| 4 | 3 | | $G_{43}$ | 1594 | | | | |
| 4 | 4 | Four-dimensional discrete symmetry groups | $G_{4}$ | 4894 | | $G_{4}^1$ | 62227 | |

== See also ==
- Multiple antisymmetry
