= Color symmetry =

Color symmetry may refer to:

Physics

- Color charge, a property of quarks and gluons in the theory of quantum chromodynamics

Mathematics

- Dichromatic symmetry, a color symmetry of 2 colors
- Polychromatic symmetry, a color symmetry of 3 or more colors
