= Tilings and patterns =

Mathematics book

- Cover of 1987 edition
- Author: Branko Grünbaum and Geoffrey Colin Shephard
- Language: English
- Subject: Tilings, patterns
- Publisher: W.H. Freeman, Dover
- Publication date: 1987
- Publication place: U.S.A.
- Media type: Print
- Pages: 700 (first edition)
- ISBN: 978-0-716-71193-3
- OCLC: 13092426
- Dewey Decimal: 511.6
- LC Class: QA166.8.G78

Tilings and patterns is a book by mathematicians Branko Grünbaum and Geoffrey Colin Shephard published in 1987 by W.H. Freeman. The book was 10 years in development, and upon publication it was widely reviewed and highly acclaimed.

== Structure and topics ==
The book is concerned with tilings—a partition of the plane into regions (the tiles)—and patterns—repetitions of a motif in the plane in a regular manner.

The book is divided into two parts. The first seven chapters define concepts and terminology, establish the general theory of tilings, survey tilings by regular polygons, review the theory of patterns, and discuss tilings in which all the tiles, or all the edges, or all the vertices, play the same role.

The last five chapters survey a variety of advanced topics in tiling theory: colored patterns and tilings, polygonal tilings, aperiodic tilings, Wang tiles, and tilings with unusual kinds of tiles.

Each chapter open with an introduction to the topic, this is followed by the detailed material of the chapter, much previously unpublished, which is always profusely illustrated, and normally includes examples and proofs. Chapters close with exercises, and a section of notes and references which detail the historical development of the topic. These notes sections are interesting and entertaining, as they discuss the efforts of the previous workers in the field and detail the good (and bad) approaches to the topic. The notes also identify unsolved problems, point out areas of potential application, and provide connections to other disciplines in mathematics, science, and the arts.

The book has 700 pages, including a 40-page, 800-entry bibliography, and an index. The book is used as a source on numerous Wikipedia pages.

== Audience ==
In their preface the authors state "We have written this book with three main groups of readers in mind—students, professional mathematicians and non-mathematicians whose interests include patterns and shapes (such as artists, architects, crystallographers and others).

Other reviewers commented as follows:

- "The most striking feature of the book is its extensive collection of figures, including hundreds of examples of tilings and patterns. The sheer abundance is perhaps one reason why artists and designers have been drawn to it over the years."
- "Their idea was that the book should be accessible to any reader who is attracted to geometry."

== Reception ==
Contemporary reviews of the book were overwhelming positive. The book was reviewed by 15 journals in the fields of crystallography, mathematics, and the sciences. Quotations from major reviews:

László Fejes Tóth wrote in Bulletin of the American Mathematical Society: "Their effort is crowned by the unique comprehensive monograph Tilings and patterns, which lays a solid foundation for one of the most attractive fields in geometry."

Solomon W. Golomb writing in The American Mathematical Monthly: "This is a marvelous book" [...] "I recommend this book enthusiastically to anyone interested in problems of tiling the plane".

H.C. Williams in The Mathematical Gazette wrote: "This is a very significant book and no University or College library should be without one and many mathematicians will desire a personal copy".

Joseph Malkevitch reviewing the book for Science wrote: "What Grünbaum and Shephard have done, in a dazzling display of scholarship, erudition, and research, is collect in one volume a compendium of the accumulated knowledge about tilings and patterns developed by a wide range of individuals including artisans and craftsmen, mathematicians, crystallographers, and physicists."

The review in American Scientist was written by Marjorie Senechal: "Every once in a while a book comes along that is required reading for the scientifically literate. Tilings and Patterns is such a book."

E. Schulte wrote the entry in zbMATH Open: "I hope that this review conveys my impression that Tilings and Patterns is an excellent book on one of the oldest mathematical disciplines. Most certainly this book will be the 'bible' for this kind of geometry."

R.L.E. Schwarzenberger wrote the review in Bulletin of the London Mathematical Society: "It is the first rigorous and authoritative account of the classification of various natural kinds of tiling (here synonymous with tessellation, mosaic or paving), and of the classification of discrete patterns which is used to achieve this."

== Influence ==
The book was praised in later journal articles by multiple authors:

"Even today, the title is often cited, because this allows manuscripts to be freed from lengthy evidence and explanations. (translated from the original German review); "I believe many people have been inspired by Grünbaum and Shephard's book"; "seminal work"; "comprehensive reference"; "The contributions of Branko Grünbaum and G.C. Shephard to the development of a coherent and rigorous theory for tilings cannot be overstated, and much of their work is summarized in their magnum opus Tilings and Patterns"; "A classic of tiling theory".

The book was also praised in later books by other authors:

Washburn and Crowe in their 1988 book Symmetries of Culture: Theory and Practice of Plane Pattern Analysis wrote "The history of the two-color and more highly colored patterns is well described in the treatise of Grünbaum and Shephard (1987), which can be taken as the definitive text for the mathematical theory of patterns in general".

Marjorie Senechal in her 1995 book Quasicrystals and geometry wrote "Tiling theory was given coherence by Grünbaum and Shephard (1987), who clarified and unified the theory of tilings of the plane and laid a theoretical foundation for much of it."

Doris Schattschneider in her 2004 book M. C. Escher: Visions of Symmetry wrote "The most comprehensive reference for all aspects of the subject is Tilings and patterns, by mathematicians Branko Grünbaum and Geoffrey Shephard".

== Editions ==
- The hardback original Tilings and patterns was published in 1987.
- Tilings and patterns - an introduction, a paperback reprint of the first seven chapters of the 1987 original, was published in 1989.
- In 2016 a second edition of the full text was published by Dover in paperback, with a new preface and an appendix describing progress in the subject since the first edition. The reviewer at MAA Reviews commented "Dover has once again done the mathematical community a service in bringing back such a notable volume."

Tilings and patterns subject coverage

#	Chapter Title	Relevant articles in Wikipedia by section §
1	Basic notions	§1.1 Tiling, Euclidean plane, packing, covering, toplogical disk, §1.2 prototile, regular tiling, monohedral tiling, k-isohedral tiling (face-transitive), §1.3 symmetry, isometry, rotation, translation, reflection, glide reflection, group, transitivity, k-isogonal tiling (vertex-transitive), §1.4 symmetry element, isomorphism, affine transformation, frieze group, wallpaper group, §1.6 fundamental domain, space group, rod group
2	Tilings by regular polygons and star polygons	§2.1 Uniform tiling, Archimedean tiling, elongated triangular tiling, snub square tiling, truncated square tiling, truncated hexagonal tiling, trihexagonal tiling, snub trihexagonal tiling, rhombitrihexagonal tiling, §2.2 list of k-uniform tilings, demiregular tiling, 3-4-3-12 tiling, 3-4-6-12 tiling, 33344-33434 tiling, §2.3 k-isotoxal tiling (edge-transitive), §2.4 tilings that are not edge-to-edge, squaring the square, §2.5 star polygon, regular star polygon, polygram, tilings using star polygons, Kepler's star tiling, pentagram, pentacle, §2.6 dissection tiling, §2.7 regular polygon, Laves tiling, tetrakis square tiling, rhombille tiling, §2.9 uniform coloring, list of uniform colorings, Archimedean and uniform coloring, §2.10 Johannes Kepler's Harmonices Mundi
3	Well-behaved tilings	§3.1 Well-behaved, singular point, locally finite, §3.2 normal tiling, Euler's theorem for tilings, §3.7 periodic tiling, §3.8 Heesch's problem, §3.9 Eberhard's theorem, §3.10 Karl Reinhardt
4	The topology of tilings	§4.1 Homeomorphism (topological equivalence), combinatorial equivalence, isotopy, Metamorphosis III, §4.2 duality, Pythagorean tiling
5	Patterns	§5.1 Pattern, motif, §5.2 group theory, symmetry group, subgroup, §5.3 2-D lattice, §5.4 Dirichlet tiling, §5.5 continuous group, §5.6 Islamic geometric patterns
6	Classification of tilings with transitivity properties	§6.2 Isohedral tiling, §6.3 isogonal tiling, §6.4 isotoxal tiling, list of isotoxal tilings, §6.5 striped pattern, §6.6 Evgraf Fedorov, Alexei Vasilievich Shubnikov, planigon, Boris Delone
7	Classification with respect to symmetries	§7.1 Conjugate element, §7.7 arrangement of lines, §7.8 Circle packing
8	Colored patterns and tilings	§§8.1-8.7 Dichromatic symmetry, polychromatic symmetry, perfect coloring, §8.8 Truchet tiles, M.C. Escher
9	Tilings by polygons	§9.1 Tilings by polygons, triangular tiling, quadrilteral tiling, pentagonal tiling, hexagonal tiling, parallelogon, §9.2 non-convex polygon tilings, §9.3 anisohedral tiling, §9.4 polyomino, heptomino, polyiamond, polyhex, §9.5 Voderberg tiling, §9.6 Marjorie Rice
10	Aperiodic tilings	§10.1 Similarity, §10.2 aperiodic tiling, Raphael M. Robinson, list of aperiodic sets of tiles, Ammann A1 tilings, §10.3 Penrose tiling, golden ratio, §10.4 Ammann–Beenker tiling, aperiodic set of prototiles, §10.7 Roger Penrose, Robert Ammann, John H. Conway, Alan Lindsay Mackay, Dan Shechtman, Einstein problem
11	Wang tiles	§11.1 Wang tile, §11.2 Hao Wang, §11.3 decidability, §11.4 Turing machine
12	Tilings with unusual kinds of tiles	§12.1 Cut point, §12.2 disconnected tiles, §12.3 hollow tiling, vertex figure, §12.4 Riemann surface, H.S.M. Coxeter
