= Symmetries of Culture: Theory and Practice of Plane Pattern Analysis =

Decorative arts book

- Cover page
- Author: Dorothy K. Washburn and Donald W. Crowe
- Language: English
- Subject: Decorative arts, patterns, mathematics and art
- Publisher: University of Washington Press, Dover
- Publication date: 1988
- Publication place: U.S.A.
- Media type: Print
- Pages: 299
- ISBN: 978-0-295-97084-4
- Dewey Decimal: 745.4
- LC Class: NK1570.W34

Symmetries of Culture: Theory and Practice of Plane Pattern Analysis is a book by anthropologist Dorothy K. Washburn and mathematician Donald W. Crowe published in 1988 by the University of Washington Press. The book is about the identification of patterns on cultural objects.

== Structure and topics ==
The book is divided into seven chapters. Chapter 1 reviews the historical application of symmetry analysis to the discovery and enumeration of patterns in the plane, otherwise known as tessellations or tilings, and the application of geometry to design and the decorative arts.

Chapters 2 to 6 describe how to identify and classify patterns on cultural objects such as ceramics, textiles and surface designs. Chapter 2 establishes the mathematical tools required to perform the symmetry analysis of patterns. Chapter 3 introduces the concept of color symmetry, for two-colored and multicolored patterns. Chapters 4 and 5 describe the one-dimensional (frieze) designs and the two-dimensional (plane) designs respectively; flow charts are used to help the reader to identify patterns. Chapter 6 describes finite designs, for example circular designs, which are those without translations or glide refections. Chapter 7 discusses problems that may arise in symmetry classification, for example pattern irregularities.

The benefit of the flow charts is that they allow the reader to analyse the design of any cultural object in order to assign it to a specific pattern. The number of distinct patterns in one or two dimensions, with one or two colors, is shown in the table.

Pattern Analysis Flow Charts
Dimension	Colors	Patterns
1	1	7
1	2	18
2	1	17
2	2	63

The book, which was 10 years in development, has over 500 illustrations, and includes a mathematical appendix, a 270-entry bibliography, and an index.

== Audience ==
The authors describe their book as a "handbook for the non-mathematician" of the theory and practice of plane pattern analysis.

Reviewers of the book identified the audience for the book in various ways. Roger Neich writing in Man said "[The authors'] aim is to make symmetry analysis accessible to all researchers, regardless of any mathematical training, and in this aim they succeed admirably, provided the reader is prepared to invest some considerable effort."

Doris Schattschneider writing in The American Mathematical Monthly commented: "[The book] was written for archaeologists, anthropologists, and art historians, but the authors have taken care in their presentation of the geometry of symmetry and color symmetry analysis." H.C. Williams reviewing the book for The Mathematical Gazette said: "This interesting book is written by a mathematician and an anthropologist and is aimed primarily at the non-mathematician. That said, it is well worth the attention of mathematicians, particularly teachers, who have an interest in pattern."

== Reception ==
Contemporary reviews of the book were mostly positive. The book was reviewed by journals in the fields of anthropology, archaeology, the arts, and mathematics.

Mary Frame in African Arts said: "a solid and attractive book that takes the reader in logical stages toward an understanding of the symmetrical basis of pattern repeats." [...] "I believe that Symmetries of Culture is a landmark work that will furnish the impetus and method for many studies in this fertile area." Owen Lindauer in American Anthropologist commented: "Question-answer flowcharts enable the reader to correctly classify designs using a standard notation. The book is extensively illustrated with carvings, textiles, basketry, tiles, and pottery, which are used as examples of various symmetry patterns."

Dwight W. Read in Antiquity: "Symmetries of Culture is an impressive book - both in terms of its physical appearance and its content. [...] will undoubtedly become the major reference on the analysis of patterns in terms of symmetry properties." Jon Muller writing in American Antiquity: " ... a fine book that achieves its goals in a straight-forward and clear fashion. It presents a set of methods that can be applied consistently and usefully in looking at symmetrical plane designs." and Roger Neich in Man: "... wide use of this book will certainly contribute to a great improvement in the systematic study of material culture."

== Criticism ==
The reviewer in African Arts pointed out the existence of cultural patterns, such as in ancient Peruvian art, that are not included in the crystallographic symmetry approach to patterns used in the book. This criticism was echoed by the reviewer in American Antiquity who had some reservations about the potential dangers of limiting design analysis to certain convenient classes of design.

George Kubler, an art historian writing in Winterthur Portfolio criticised the book: "The authors' present method is non-historical. The objects illustrated are mostly undatable, and nowhere is concern shown for their seriation or place in time." Kubler criticises the authors' entire approach as being non-historical, because it analyses each object individually rather than considering them in chronological order.

== Influence ==
In 2021 the book was praised by Palaguta and Starkova in Terra Artis. Art and Design. In their review, they stated that the problem of creating a basis for systematizing patterns on the principles of symmetry was solved in Symmetries of Culture. They give three reasons for continuing to value the book: firstly, despite the passage of time, the book is still valid and useful; secondly, since the release of the book, the authors have done a great deal to attract new workers into the field; and thirdly, in recent years, interdisciplinary research on symmetry and ornamentation has increased, and the interest in this topic has grown among both anthropologists and art historians, which greatly broadens the readership of the book.

== Editions ==
- The hardback original Symmetries of Culture: Theory and Practice of Plane Pattern Analysis was published in 1988.
- A paperback reprint was published in 1992.
- In 2020 a paperback reprint of the full text was published by Dover.
