= Quantum dimer magnet =

In condensed matter physics, the quantum dimer magnet state is one in which quantum spins in a magnetic structure entangle to form a singlet state. These entangled spins act as bosons and their excited states (triplons) can undergo Bose-Einstein condensation (BEC). The quantum dimer system was originally proposed by Matsubara and Matsuda as a mapping of the lattice Bose gas to the quantum antiferromagnet. Quantum dimer magnets are often confused as valence bond solids; however, a valence bond solid requires the breaking of translational symmetry and the dimerizing of spins. In contrast, quantum dimer magnets exist in crystal structures where the translational symmetry is inherently broken. There are two types of quantum dimer models: the XXZ model and the weakly-coupled dimer model. The main difference is the regime in which BEC can occur. For the XXZ model (commonly referred to as the magnon BEC), the BEC occurs upon cooling without a magnetic field and manifests itself as a symmetric dome in the field versus temperature phase diagram centered about H = 0. The weakly-coupled dimer model does not magnetically order in zero magnetic field, but instead orders upon the closing of the spin gap, where the BEC regime begins and is a dome centered at non-zero field.

Quantum dimer systems are considered to be of interest due to their relatively simple interactions and their BEC state is of interest as a novel playground for testing BEC physics. In addition, the BEC state of the quantum dimer magnet is thought to be a spin superfluid which could allow for the transfer of spin information over long distances without loss.

== Bose-Einstein condensation in the weakly-coupled dimer model ==
The Bose-Einstein condensation in quantum dimer systems is, at its essence, a field-induced magnetically ordered state that comes about from the Zeeman splitting of the triplet states. The bosons of the Bose-Einstein condensate can be thought of as the component of the spin parallel to the applied magnetic field, reaching a maximum when the spins become polarized by the field. The difference between the Bose-Einstein condensation and a typical ordered state is the spontaneous breaking of the spin's U(1) symmetry (i.e. the circular symmetry transverse to an applied magnetic field). This spontaneous symmetry breaking gives rise to a Goldstone boson that is measureable via a inelastic neutron scattering (amongst other techniques).
