= Lithium molybdenum purple bronze =

Chemical compound

Lithium molybdenum purple bronze is a chemical compound with formula Li_{0.9}Mo_{6}O_{17}, that is, a mixed oxide of molybdenum and lithium. It can be obtained as flat crystals with a purple-red color and metallic sheen (hence the "purple bronze" name).

This compound is one of several molybdenum bronzes with general formula A_{x}Mo_{y}O_{z} where A is an alkali metal or thallium Tl. It stands out among them (and also among the sub-class of "purple" molybdenum bronzes) for its peculiar electrical properties, including a marked anisotropy that makes it a "quasi-1D" conductor, and a metal-to-insulator transition as it is cooled below 30 K.

== Preparation ==
The compound was first obtained by Martha Greenblatt and others by a temperature gradient flux technique. In a typical preparation, a stoichiometric melt of Li_{2}MoO_{4}, MoO_{2} and MoO_{3} is maintained in a temperature gradient from 490 to 640 °C oven 15 cm in vacuum over several days. Excess reagents are dissolved with a hot potassium carbonate solution releasing metallic-purple plate-like crystals, a couple mm wide and less than a mm thick.

== Structure ==
The crystal structure of Li_{0.9}Mo_{6}O_{17} was determined by Onoda and others through single-crystal X-ray diffraction. The crystal system is monoclinic, with approximate unit cell dimensions a = 1.2762 nm, b = 0.5523 nm, and c = 0.9499 nm, with angle β = 90.61°, volume V = 0.6695 nm^{3} and Z = 2. In typical crystals, a is the shortest dimension (perpendicular to the plates) and b the longest. The density is 4.24 g/cm^{3}. The structure is rather different from that of potassium molybdenum purple bronze K_{0.9}Mo_{6}O_{17}, except that both are organized in layers. The difference may be explained by the relative sizes of the K^{+} and Li^{+} ions.

The unit cell contains six crystallographically independent molybdenum sites. One-third of the molybdenum atoms are surrounded by four oxygens, two thirds are surrounded by six oxygens. The crystal is a stack of slabs; each slab consists of three layers of distorted MoO_{6} octahedra sharing corners. The lithium ions are inserted in the large vacant sites between the slabs. There are zigzag chains of alternating molybdenum and oxygen atoms extending along the b axis.

== Properties ==
Lithium molybdenum purple bronze is quite different than the sodium, potassium and thallium analogs. It has a three-dimensional crystal structure, but a pseudo-one-dimensional (1D) metallic character, eventually becoming a superconductor at about 2 K. Its properties are most spectacular below 5 meV. The Tomonaga-Luttinger liquid theory has been invoked to explain its anomalous behavior.

=== Electrical conductivity ===
At room temperature, Greenblatt and others (in 1984) measured the resistivity of lithium purple bronze along the a, b and c axes as 2.47 Ω cm, 0.0095 Ω cm, and on the order of 0.25 Ω cm, respectively. The conductivities would be in the ratio 1:250:10, which would make this compound an almost one-dimensional conductor. However, Da Luz and others (2007) measured 0.079, 0.018, and 0.050 Ω cm, respectively, which corresponds to conductivity ratios 1:6:2.4 for a:b:c; whereas H. Chen and others (2010) measured 0.854, 0.016, and 0.0645 Ω cm, respectively, which correspond to conductivity ratios of 1:53:13.

This anisotropy has been attributed to the crystal structure, specifically to the zig-zag chains of molybdenum and oxygen atoms

=== Resistivity and temperature ===
The resistivity along all three axes increases linearly with temperature from about 30 K to 300 K, as in a metal. This is anomalous since such a law is expected above the Debye temperature (= 400 K for this compound) The resistivity ratios along the three axes are preserved in that range.

=== Metal-insulator transition ===
As the lithium purple bronze is cooled from 30 K to 20, it changes abruptly to an insulator. After reaching a minimum at about 24 K, the resistivity increases 10-fold and becomes somewhat more isotropic, with conductivities 1:25:14. The anisotropy is partially restored if a magnetic field is applied perpendicular to the b axis. The transition may be related to the onset of a charge density wave. Santos and others have observed that the thermal expansion coefficient is largest along the a axis, so cooling will bring the conducting chains closer together, leading to a dimensional cross-over. The theory of Luttinger liquids then predicts such behavior. Anyway, as of 2010 there was no consensus explanation for this transition. In 2023 it has been suggested that the strange behaviour could be by emergent symmetry (in contrast to symmetry breaking) from interference between the conduction electrons and dark excitons

=== Superconducting state ===
Lithium molybdenum purple bronze becomes superconductor between 1 and 2 K.

=== Thermal conductivity ===
Li_{0.9}Mo_{6}O_{17}, due to spin–charge separation, can have a much higher thermal conductivity than predicted by the Wiedemann-Franz law.

=== Magnetoresistance ===
The magnetoresistance of lithium purple bronze is negative when the magnetic field is applied along the b-axis, but large and positive when the field is applied along the a-axis and the c-axis.

== See also ==
- Sodium tungsten bronze Na_{x}WO_{3}, a golden to purple metallic-looking compound.
- Magnetochromism
