= Molybdenum bronze =

Generic name for certain mixed oxides of molybdenum

In chemistry, molybdenum bronze is a generic name for certain mixed oxides of molybdenum with the generic formula A_{x}Mo_{y}O_{z} where A may be hydrogen, an alkali metal cation (such as Li^{+}, Na^{+}, K^{+}), and Tl^{+}. These compounds form deeply coloured plate-like crystals with a metallic sheen, hence their name. These bronzes derive their metallic character from partially occupied 4d bands. The oxidation states in K_{0.28}MoO_{3} are K^{+1}, O^{2−}, and Mo^{+5.72}. MoO_{3} is an insulator, with an unfilled 4d band.

These compounds have been much studied since the 1980s due to their markedly anisotropic electrical properties, reflecting their layered structure. The electrical resistivity can vary considerably depending on the direction, in some cases by 200:1 or more. They are generally non-stoichiometric compounds. Some are metals and some are semiconductors.

== Preparation ==
The first report of a "molybdenum bronze" was by Alfred Stavenhagen and E. Engels in 1895. They reported that electrolysis of molten Na_{2}MoO_{4} and MoO_{3} gave indigo-blue needles with metallic sheen, which they analysed by weight as Na_{2}Mo_{5}O_{7}. The first unambiguous synthesis of alkali molybdenum bronzes was reported only in 1964, by Wold and others. They obtained two potassium bronzes, "red" K_{0.26}MoO_{3} and "blue" K_{0.28}MoO_{3}, by electrolysis of molten K_{2}MoO_{4}+MoO_{3} at 550 °C and 560 °C, respectively. Sodium bronzes were also obtained by the same method. It was observed that at a slightly higher temperature (about 575 °C and above) only MoO_{2} is obtained.

Another preparation technique involves crystallization from the melt in a temperature gradient. This report also called attention to the marked anisotropic resistivity of the purple lithium bronze Li_{0.9}Mo_{6}O_{17} and its metal-to-insulator transition at about 24 K.

Hydrogen bronzes H_{x}MoO_{3} were obtained in 1950 by Glemser and Lutz, by ambient-temperature reactions. (Note: The article by Glemser and Lutz mentions thermal decomposition ("thermische Zersetzung" in German), and that does not seem like an ambient temperature though.) The hydrogen in these compounds can be replaced by alkali metals by treatment with solutions of the corresponding halides. Reactions are conducted in an autoclave at about 160 °C.

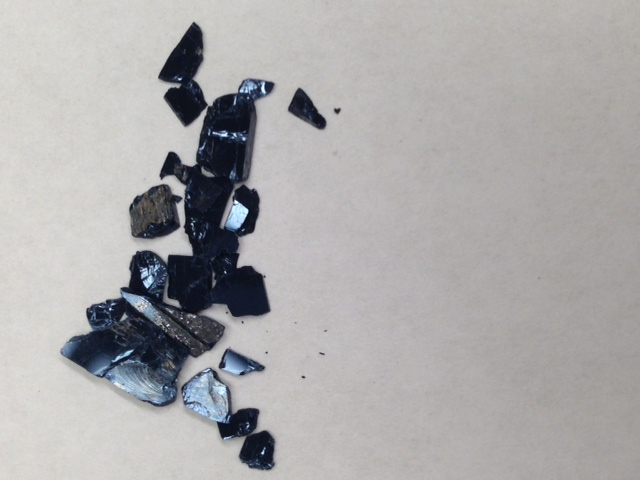
Crystals of K_{0.28}MoO_{3}, also called "potassium-molybdenum blue bronze".

== Classification ==
Molybdenum bronzes are classified in three major families:

- Red bronzes with limiting composition A_{0.33}MoO_{3}, that is, AMo_{3}O_{9}:
  - Lithium molybdenum red bronze Li_{0.33}MoO_{3} Reau and others.
  - Potassium molybdenum red bronze K_{0.26}Mo_{1.02}O_{3} or K_{0.3}MoO_{3}
  - Cesium molybdenum red bronze Cs_{0.33}MoO_{3}
  - Potassium molybdenum red bronze K_{0.23}Mo_{1.01}O_{3} a semi-conductor.
- Blue bronzes, with limiting composition A_{0.30}MoO_{3}, that is, A_{3}Mo_{10}O_{30}. Their electronic properties generally do not depend on the metal A.
  - Potassium molybdenum blue bronze K_{0.28}Mo_{1.02}O_{3} or K_{0.3}MoO_{3}
  - Rubidium molybdenum blue bronze Rb_{0.3}MoO_{3}
  - Thallium molybdenum blue bronze Tl_{0.3}MoO_{3}
- Purple bronzes, generally with limiting formula A_{0.9}Mo_{6}O_{17}. Their electronic properties depend strongly on the metal A.
  - Lithium molybdenum purple bronze Li_{0.9}Mo_{6}O_{17}
  - Sodium molybdenum purple bronze Na_{0.9}Mo_{6}O_{17}
  - Potassium molybdenum purple bronze K_{0.9}Mo_{6}O_{17}
  - Rubidium molybdenum purple bronze Rb_{0.9}Mo_{6}O_{17}
  - Thallium molybdenum purple bronze Cs_{0.9}Mo_{6}O_{17}

The hydrogen molybdenum bronzes have similar appearances but different compositions:

- Hydrogen molybdenum orthorhombic blue bronze H_{x}MoO_{3}, 0.23 < x < 0.4
- Hydrogen molybdenum monoclinic blue bronze H_{x}MoO_{3}, 0.85 < x < 1.4
- Hydrogen molybdenum red bronze H_{x}MoO_{3}, 1.55 < x < 1.72
- Hydrogen molybdenum green bronze H_{2}MoO_{3} or MoO_{2}.H_{2}O

Other molybdenum bronzes with anomalous electrical properties have been reported, which do not fit in these families. These include

- Tetragonal KMo_{4}O_{6}
- K_{x}MoO_{2−δ}.

== See also ==
- Sodium tungsten bronze – Chemical intercalation compound
