= Robert Ammann =

American mathematician (1921–2006)

Robert Ammann (October 1, 1946 – May, 1994) was an amateur mathematician who made several significant and groundbreaking contributions to the theory of quasicrystals and aperiodic tilings.

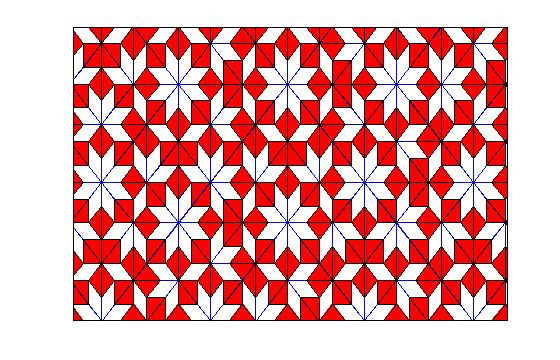
Ammann–Beenker tiling

Ammann attended Brandeis University, but generally did not go to classes, and left after three years. He worked as a programmer for Honeywell. After twelve years, his position was eliminated as part of a routine cutback, and Ammann ended up working as a mail sorter for a post office.

In 1975, Ammann read an announcement by Martin Gardner of new work by Roger Penrose. Penrose had discovered two simple sets of aperiodic tiles, each consisting of just two quadrilaterals. Since Penrose was taking out a patent, he wasn't ready to publish them, and Gardner's description was rather vague. Ammann wrote a letter to Gardner, describing his own work, which duplicated one of Penrose's sets, plus a foursome of "golden rhombohedra" that formed aperiodic tilings in space.

More letters followed, and Ammann became a correspondent with many of the professional researchers. He discovered several new aperiodic tilings, each among the simplest known examples of aperiodic sets of tiles. He also showed how to generate tilings using lines in the plane as guides for lines marked on the tiles, now called "Ammann bars".

The discovery of quasicrystals in 1982 changed the status of aperiodic tilings and Ammann's work from mere recreational mathematics to respectable academic research.

After more than ten years of coaxing, he agreed to meet various professionals in person, and eventually even went to two conferences and delivered a lecture at each. Afterwards, Ammann dropped out of sight, and died of a heart attack a few years later. News of his death did not reach the research community for a few more years.

Five sets of tiles discovered by Ammann were described in Tilings and patterns and later, in collaboration with the authors of the book, he published a paper proving the aperiodicity for four of them. Ammann's discoveries came to notice only after Penrose had published his own discovery and gained priority. In 1981 de Bruijn exposed the cut and project method and in 1984 came the sensational news about Shechtman quasicrystals which promoted the Penrose tiling to fame. But in 1982 Beenker published a similar mathematical explanation for the octagonal case which became known as the Ammann–Beenker tiling. In 1987 Wang, Chen and Kuo announced the discovery of a quasicrystal with octagonal symmetry. The decagonal covering of the Penrose tiling was proposed in 1996 and two years later Ben Abraham and Gähler proposed an octagonal variant for the Ammann–Beenker tiling. Ammann's name became that of the perennial second. It is acknowledged however that Ammann first proposed the construction of rhombic prisms which is the three-dimensional model of Shechtman's quasicrystals.

== See also ==
- List of aperiodic sets of tiles, includes Ammann's tilings
- Ammann A1 tilings
- Ammann A5 tilings, also discusses Ammann A4 tilings
