= Birkhoff–Grothendieck theorem =

Classifies holomorphic vector bundles over the complex projective line

In mathematics, the Birkhoff–Grothendieck theorem classifies holomorphic vector bundles over the complex projective line. In particular every holomorphic vector bundle over $\mathbb{CP}^1$ is a direct sum of holomorphic line bundles. The theorem was proved by Alexander Grothendieck (1957, Theorem 2.1), and is more or less equivalent to Birkhoff factorization introduced by George David Birkhoff (1909).

== Statement ==
More precisely, the statement of the theorem is as the following.

Every holomorphic vector bundle $\mathcal{E}$ on $\mathbb{CP}^1$ is holomorphically isomorphic to a direct sum of line bundles:

$$\mathcal{E}\cong\mathcal{O}(a_1)\oplus \cdots \oplus \mathcal{O}(a_n).$$

The notation implies each summand is a Serre twist some number of times of the trivial bundle. The representation is unique up to permuting factors.

== Generalization ==
The same result holds in algebraic geometry for algebraic vector bundle over $\mathbb{P}^1_k$ for any field $k$. It also holds for $\mathbb{P}^1$ with one or two orbifold points, and for chains of projective lines meeting along nodes.

== Applications ==
One application of this theorem is it gives a classification of all coherent sheaves on $\mathbb{CP}^1$. We have two cases, vector bundles and coherent sheaves supported along a subvariety, so $\mathcal{O}(k), \mathcal{O}_{nx}$ where n is the degree of the fat point at $x \in \mathbb{CP}^1$. Since the only subvarieties are points, we have a complete classification of coherent sheaves.

== See also ==
- Algebraic geometry of projective spaces
- Euler sequence
- Splitting principle
- K-theory
- Jumping line
