= Wladyslaw Opechowski =

Polish and Canadian theoretical physicist (1911–1993)

Wladyslaw Opechowski (Polish: Władysław Opęchowski, 10 March 1911 – 27 September 1993) was a Polish and Canadian theoretical physicist. He is known for the work on the quantum theory of magnetism and group-theoretic classification of magnetic structures, which led to the Opechowski–Guccione convention in magnetic space groups.

== Education and career ==
Opechowski was born in Warsaw as the son of Edward Opechowski, an electrical engineer, and Wanda Pelz, a social activist. He studied mathematics and physics at the University of Warsaw from 1931 to 1935. In 1935, he completed a research internship in France at the University of Paris and in the Netherlands, where he was an assistant for Hans Kramers and later studied under Adriaan Fokker and Léon Rosenfeld. After returning to Poland in 1937, he became an assistant of Czesław Białobrzeski at the Department of Theoretical Physics of the University of Warsaw, and also started teaching at the university. Opechowski moved to Leiden University in 1939 and remained working there until 1945. This was followed by another research position at the Philips Natuurkundig Laboratorium from 1945 to 1948 in Eindhoven.

Opechowski emigrated to Vancouver, Canada in September 1948 and became a professor of physics at the University of British Columbia and remained there for the rest of his career. After retiring in 1976, he continued to work there as an emeritus professor.

== Honors and awards ==
Opechowski served as the Lorentz chair and delivered the invited lecture at Leiden University from 1964 to 1965. He became a member of the Royal Society of Canada since 1960. He received an honorary doctorate from the University of Wroclaw in 1973. He received the Marian Smoluchowski Medal from the Polish Physical Society in 1982.

== Bibliography ==
- Opechowski, W. (1937). "On the exchange interaction in magnetic crystals". Physica. 4 (2): 181–199. Bibcode:1937Phy.....4..181O. doi:10.1016/S0031-8914(37)80135-4.
- Opechowski, W. (1940). "Sur les groupes cristallographiques "doubles"". Physica (in French). 7 (6): 552–562. Bibcode:1940Phy.....7..552O. doi:10.1016/S0031-8914(40)90045-3.
- Opechowski, W.; Guccione, R. (1965). "Magnetic Symmetry". In Rado, George T.; Suhl, Harry (eds.). Magnetism. Vol. IIA: Statistical Models, Magnetic Symmetry, Hyperfine Interactions, and Metals. New York: Academic Press. pp. 205–242. ISBN 978-0-12-575302-9.
- Opechowski, W.; Dreyfus, T. (1 September 1971). "Classifications of magnetic structures". Acta Crystallographica Section A. 27 (5): 470–484. Bibcode:1971AcCrA..27..470O. doi:10.1107/S0567739471001025. ISSN 0567-7394.
- Opechowski, W. (1977), "Metacrystallographic Groups", Group Theoretical Methods in Physics, Elsevier, pp. 93–113, doi:10.1016/b978-0-12-637650-0.50012-7, ISBN 978-0-12-637650-0
- Opechowski, W. (1986). Crystallographic and Metacrystallographic Groups. North-Holland. ISBN 978-0-444-86955-5.
