= Yoshio Shimamoto =

Yoshio Shimamoto was a nuclear physicist who also did work in mathematics and computer science. While at Brookhaven National Laboratory (1954-1987), he designed the logic for the MERLIN digital computer in 1958, and served as chairman of the Applied Mathematics Department from 1964 to 1975. Shimamoto researched in combinatorial mathematics, the economics of outer continental shelf oil and gas lease sales (on behalf of the U.S. Geological Survey), the architecture of supercomputers, and the linking of computers for parallel processing.

During the 1970s, he worked with Heinrich Heesch and Karl Durre on methods for a computer-aided proof of the four color theorem, using computer programs to apply Heesch's notion of "discharging" to eliminate 4-colorable cases. A proof of the Four Color Theorem, which he presented in 1971, was later shown to be flawed, but it served as the basis for further work.

Born in Hawaii in 1924, Shimamoto served with the U.S. Army Signal Corps and Strategic Bombing Survey in Japan, during World War II. He died in New Jersey on August 27, 2009.
