= Magnetochromism =

Magnetochromism is the term applied when a chemical compound changes colour under the influence of a magnetic field. In particular the magneto-optical effects exhibited by complex mixed metal compounds are called magnetochromic when they occur in the visible region of the spectrum. Examples include K_{2}V_{3}O_{8}, lithium molybdenum purple bronze Li_{0.9}Mo_{6}O_{17}, and related mixed oxides. Reported magnetochromic compounds are multiferroic manganese tungsten oxide and multiferroic bismuth ferrite.

Magnetically–induced color change can also occur in aqueous solutions of colloidal Fe_{3}O_{4} nanoparticles that are ~10 nm in diameter. Paramagnetic Fe_{3}O_{4} particles are extracted from a petroleum–based ferrofluid or synthesized in a laboratory and then suspended in water. When exposed to a strengthening magnetic field these particles organize into chains that diffract light and cause the solution to change color from a brown to red, yellow, green and then blue. Manufacturers encapsulate microscopic droplets of this solution in a thin plastic film to create a magnetochromic magnetic field viewing screen.

== See also ==
- Multiple antisymmetry
