= Sodium tungsten bronze =

Chemical intercalation compound

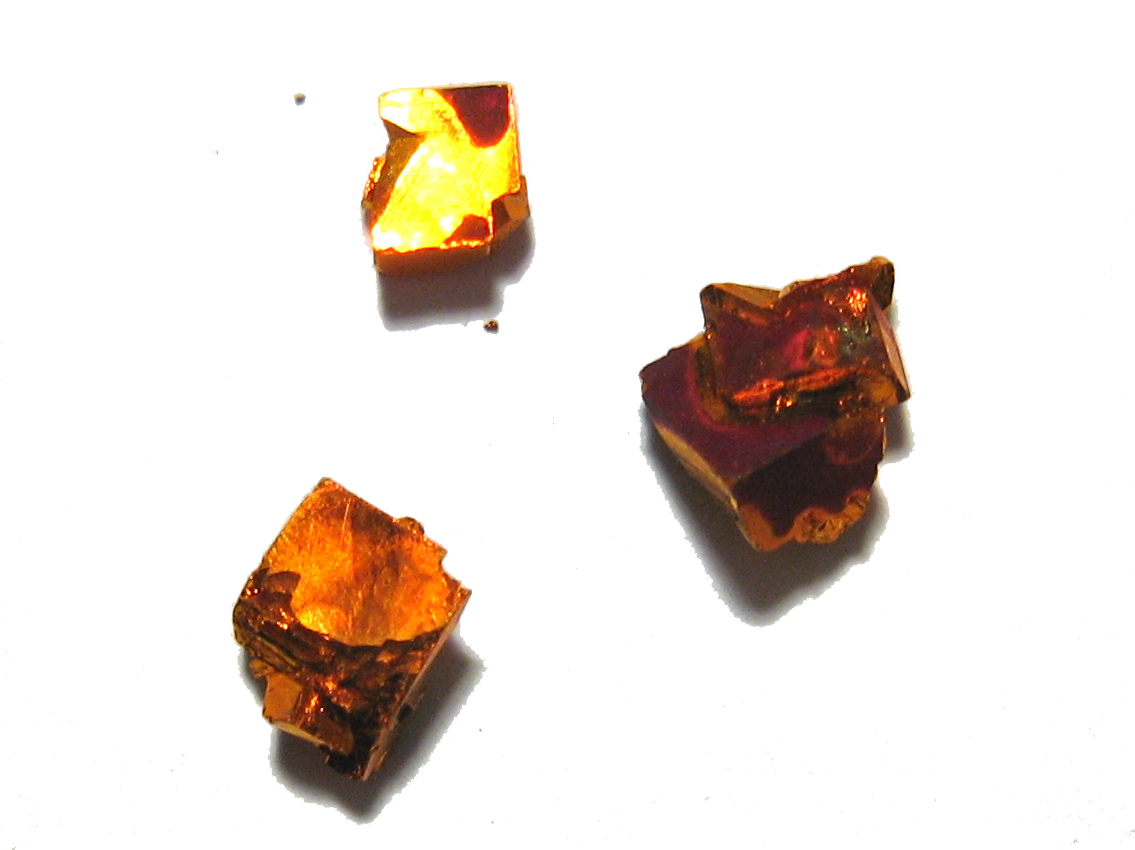
Three crystals of sodium tungsten bronze, showing its lustre and colouration.

Sodium tungsten bronze is a form of insertion compound with the formula Na_{x}WO_{3}, where x is equal to or less than 1. So named because of its metallic lustre, its electrical properties range from semiconducting to metallic depending on the concentration of sodium ions present; it can also exhibit superconductivity.

== History ==
Prepared in 1823 by the chemist Friedrich Wöhler, sodium tungsten bronze was the first alkali metal bronze to be discovered. Tungsten bronzes owe some of their properties to the relative stability of the tungsten(V) cation that is formed. A similar family of molybdenum bronzes may have been discovered in 1885 by Alfred Stavenhagen and E. Engels, but they are formed in a very narrow range of temperatures and were not reported again until the 1960s.

== Properties ==
Sodium tungsten bronze, like other tungsten bronzes, is resistant to chemical reaction under both acidic and basic conditions. Colour is dependent upon the proportion of sodium in the compound, ranging from golden at x ≈ 0.9, through red, orange and deep purple, to blue-black when x ≈ 0.3.

The electrical resistivity of the bronze depends on the proportion of sodium in the compound, with specific resistances of 1.66 mΩ being measured for some samples. It has been suggested that electrons, released when the sodium atoms are ionised, are conducted readily through the tungsten t_{2g} and oxygen π orbitals. This can be observed in the XPS and UPS spectra: the peak representing the tungsten 5d band becomes more intense as x rises.

For values of x below 0.3, the bronze is semiconducting rather than metallic. When cooled sufficiently, sodium tungsten bronze becomes a superconductor, with the critical temperature (T_{c}) for Na_{0.23}WO_{3} being approximately 2.2 kelvin. The first record of superconductivity in a tungsten bronze was in 1964, with a T_{c} of 0.57 K.

== Structure ==
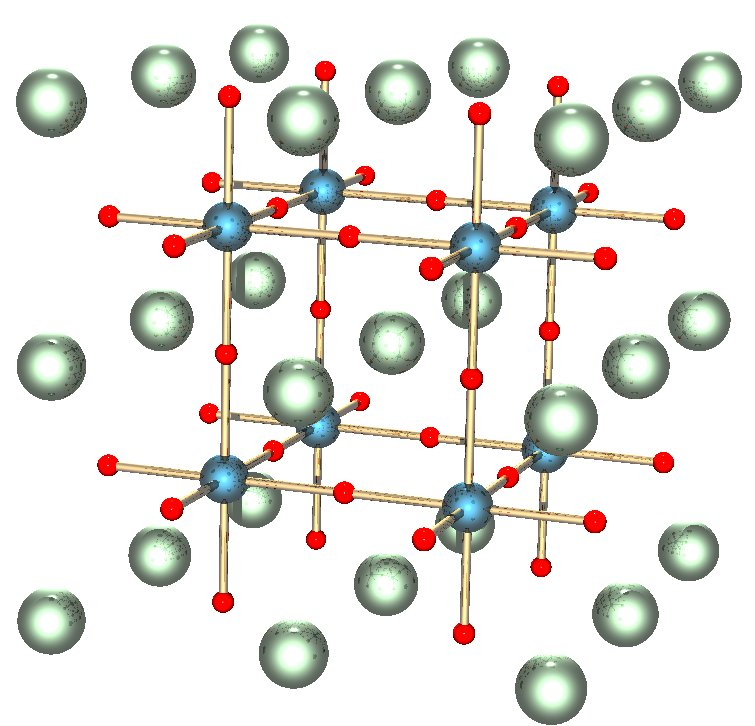
Structure of perovskite crystal structure with the formula ABX_{3}.

When x = 1, sodium tungsten bronze adopts a cubic phase: the perovskite crystal structure. In this form, the structure consists of corner-sharing WO_{6} octahedra with sodium ions in the interstitial gaps. For x values between 0.9 and 0.3, the structure remains similar but with an increasing deficiency of sodium ions and a smaller lattice parameter.

A number of other structure types can also be adopted, with varying electrical properties: cubic, tetragonal I and hexagonal phases are metallic, whereas orthorhombic and tetragonal II structures are semiconducting.

== Synthesis ==
Wöhler's 1823 synthesis involved reducing sodium tungstate and tungsten trioxide with hydrogen gas at red heat. A more modern approach reduces a melt of the reactants with electricity rather than with hydrogen. Microwave synthesis is also possible, using tungsten powder as the reducing agent. Hydrothermal (both batch and flow) syntheses are also possible.

== Related compounds ==
The sodium in this compound can be replaced by other alkali metals to form their tungsten bronzes, and by other metals such as tin and lead. Molybdenum bronzes also exist but are less stable than their tungsten counterparts.
