= Magnetic space group =

Concept in physics

In solid state physics, the magnetic space groups, or Shubnikov groups, are the symmetry groups which classify the symmetries of a crystal both in space, and in a two-valued property such as electron spin. To represent such a property, each lattice point is colored black or white, and in addition to the usual three-dimensional symmetry operations, there is a so-called "antisymmetry" operation which turns all black lattice points white and all white lattice points black. Thus, the magnetic space groups serve as an extension to the crystallographic space groups which describe spatial symmetry alone.

The application of magnetic space groups to crystal structures is motivated by Curie's Principle. Compatibility with a material's symmetries, as described by the magnetic space group, is a necessary condition for a variety of material properties, including ferromagnetism, ferroelectricity, topological insulation.

== History ==
A major step was the work of Heinrich Heesch, who first rigorously established the concept of antisymmetry as part of a series of papers in 1929 and 1930. Applying this antisymmetry operation to the 32 crystallographic point groups gives a total of 122 magnetic point groups. However, although Heesch correctly laid out each of the magnetic point groups, his work remained obscure, and the point groups were later re-derived by Tavger and Zaitsev. The concept was more fully explored by Shubnikov in terms of color symmetry. When applied to space groups, the number increases from the usual 230 three dimensional space groups to 1651 magnetic space groups, as found in the 1953 thesis of Alexandr Zamorzaev. While the magnetic space groups were originally found using geometry, it was later shown the same magnetic space groups can be found using generating sets.

== Description ==
=== Magnetic space groups ===
The magnetic space groups can be placed into three categories. First, the 230 colorless groups contain only spatial symmetry, and correspond to the crystallographic space groups. Then there are 230 grey groups, which are invariant under antisymmetry. Finally are the 1191 black-white groups, which contain the more complex symmetries. There are two common conventions for giving names to the magnetic space groups. They are Opechowski-Guccione (named after Wladyslaw Opechowski and Rosalia Guccione) and Belov-Neronova-Smirnova (named after Nikolay Vasilyevich Belov, Nina Nikolaevna Neronova and Tamara Serafimovna Smirnova, then Kuntsevich). For colorless and grey groups, the conventions use the same names, but they treat the black-white groups differently. A full list of the magnetic space groups (in both conventions) can be found both in the original papers, and in several places online.

Types of magnetic space groups
| Type | Name | Number of groups | Description |
|---|---|---|---|
| Type I | Colorless groups | 230 | Ordinary crystallographic space groups, without any additional symmetry. |
| Type II | Grey groups | 230 | Space groups, with an additional anti-symmetry version of every symmetry operation. |
| Type III | Black-White groups (ordinary Bravais lattices) | 674 | Space groups, with additional anti-symmetry versions of half of the symmetry operations. |
| Type IV | Black-White groups (black-white Bravais Lattices) | 517 | Space groups, with additional combined spatial translation-time reversal symmetry. |

The types can be distinguished by their different construction. Type I magnetic space groups, $\mathcal{M}_I$ are identical to the ordinary space groups,$G$.

$$\mathcal{M}_I=G$$

Type II magnetic space groups, $\mathcal{M}_{II}$, are made up of all the symmetry operations of the crystallographic space group, $G$, plus the product of those operations with time reversal operation, $\mathcal{T}$. Equivalently, this can be seen as the direct product of an ordinary space group with the point group $1'$.

$$\mathcal{M}_{II}=G + \mathcal{T}G$$
$$\mathcal{M}_{II}=G \times 1'$$

Type III magnetic space groups, $\mathcal{M}_{III}$, are constructed using a group $H$, which is a subgroup of $G$ with index 2.

$$\mathcal{M}_{III}=H + \mathcal{T} (G-H)$$

Type IV magnetic space groups, $\mathcal{M}_{IV}$, are constructed with the use of a pure translation, $\{E|t_0\}$, which is Seitz notation for null rotation and a translation, $t_0$. Here the $t_0$ is a vector (usually given in fractional coordinates) pointing from a black colored point to a white colored point, or vice versa.

$$\mathcal{M}_{IV}=G + \mathcal{T}\{E|t_0\}G$$

=== Magnetic point groups ===
The following table lists all of the 122 possible three-dimensional magnetic point groups. This is given in the short version of Hermann–Mauguin notation in the following table. Here, the addition of an apostrophe to a symmetry operation indicates that the combination of the symmetry element and the antisymmetry operation is a symmetry of the structure. There are 32 Crystallographic point groups, 32 grey groups, and 58 magnetic point groups.

| Crystallographic point groups | Grey point groups | Magnetic point groups | | | | |
|---|---|---|---|---|---|---|
| 1 | 1' | | | | | |
| 1̅ | 1̅1' | 1̅' | | | | |
| 2 | 21' | 2' | | | | |
| m | m1' | m' | | | | |
| 2/m | 2/m1' | 2'/m' | 2/m' | 2'/m | | |
| 222 | 2221' | 2'2'2 | | | | |
| mm2 | mm21' | m'm'2 | 2'm'm | | | |
| mmm | mmm1' | mm'm' | m'm'm' | mmm' | | |
| 4 | 41' | 4' | | | | |
| 4̅ | 4̅1' | 4̅' | | | | |
| 4/m | 4/m1' | 4'/m | 4/m' | 4'/m' | | |
| 422 | 4221' | 4'22' | 42'2' | | | |
| 4mm | 4mm1' | 4'mm' | 4m'm' | | | |
| 4̅2m | 4̅2m1' | 4̅'2m' | 4̅'m2' | 4̅2'm' | | |
| 4/mmm | 4/mmm1' | 4'/mmm' | 4/mm'm' | 4/m'm'm' | 4/m'mm | 4'/m'm'm |
| 3 | 31' | | | | | |
| 3̅ | 3̅1' | 3̅' | | | | |
| 32 | 321' | 32' | | | | |
| 3m | 3m1' | 3m' | | | | |
| 3̅m | 3̅m1' | 3̅m' | 3̅'m' | 3̅'m | | |
| 6 | 61' | 6' | | | | |
| 6̅ | 6̅1' | 6̅' | | | | |
| 6/m | 6/m1' | 6'/m' | 6/m' | 6'/m | | |
| 622 | 6221' | 6'22' | 62'2' | | | |
| 6mm | 6mm1' | 6'mm' | 6m'm' | | | |
| 6̅m2 | 6̅m21' | 6̅'2m' | 6̅'m2' | 6̅m'2' | | |
| 6/mmm | 6/mmm1' | 6'/m'mm' | 6/mm'm' | 6/m'm'm' | 6/m'mm | 6'/mmm' |
| 23 | 231' | | | | | |
| m3̅ | m3̅1' | m'3̅' | | | | |
| 432 | 4321' | 4'32' | | | | |
| 4̅3m | 4̅3m1' | 4̅'3m' | | | | |
| m3̅m | m3̅m1' | m3̅m' | m'3̅'m' | m'3̅'m | | |

The magnetic point groups which are compatible with ferromagnetism are colored cyan, the magnetic point groups which are compatible with ferroelectricity are colored red, and the magnetic point groups which are compatible with both ferromagnetism and ferroelectricity are purple. There are 31 magnetic point groups which are compatible with ferromagnetism. These groups, sometimes called admissible, leave at least one component of the spin invariant under operations of the point group. There are 31 point groups compatible with ferroelectricity; these are generalizations of the crystallographic polar point groups. There are also 31 point groups compatible with the theoretically proposed ferrotorodicity. Similar symmetry arguments have been extended to other electromagnetic material properties such as magnetoelectricity or piezoelectricity.

The following diagrams show the stereographic projection of most of the magnetic point groups onto a flat surface. Not shown are the grey point groups, which look identical to the ordinary crystallographic point groups, except they are also invariant under the antisymmetry operation.

| 1 | | | | 1̅ | 1̅' |
| 2 | 2' | | | m | m' |
| 2/m | 2/m' | 2'/m | 2'/m' | | |
| 222 | 2'2'2 | | mm2 | m'm'2 | mm'2' |
| mmm | m'm'm' | mmm' | m'm'm | | |
| 4 | 4' | | | 4̅ | 4̅' |
| 4/m | 4/m' | 4'/m' | 4/m' | | |
| 422 | 4'22' | 42'2' | | | |
| 4mm | 4m'm' | 4'mm' | | | |
| 4̅2m | 4̅2'm' | 4̅'2m' | 4̅'2'm | | |
| 4/mmm | 4/m'm'm' | 4/m'mm | 4'/mmm' | 4'/m'm'm | 4/mm'm' |
| 3 | | | | 3̅ | 3̅' |
| 32 | 32' | | | 3m | 3m' |
| 3̅m | 3̅m' | 3̅'m' | 3̅'m | | |
| 6 | 6' | | | 6̅ | 6̅' |
| 6/m | 6/m' | 6'/m' | 6/m' | | |
| 622 | 62'2' | 6'2'2 | | | |
| 6mm | 6m'm' | 6'mm' | | | |
| 6̅m2 | 6̅m'2' | 6̅'m2' | 6̅'m'2 | | |
| 6/mmm | 6'/mmm' | 6'/m'mm' | 6/m'm'm' | 6/m'mm | 6/mm'm' |
| 23 | | | | m3̅ | m'3̅' |
| 432 | 4'32' | | | 4̅3m | 4̅'3m' |
| m3̅m | m'3̅'m' | m'3̅'m | m3̅m' | | |

=== Black-white Bravais lattices ===
The black-white Bravais lattices characterize the translational symmetry of the structure like the typical Bravais lattices, but also contain additional symmetry elements. For black-white Bravais lattices, the number of black and white sites is always equal. There are 14 traditional Bravais lattices, 14 grey lattices, and 22 black-white Bravais lattices, for a total of 50 two-color lattices in three dimensions.

Magnetic (black-white) Bravais lattices
Triclinic lattice system
| Black-white (antisymmetric) 3D Bravais Lattice number 1 (Triclinic system) | Black-white (antisymmetric) 3D Bravais Lattice number 2 (Triclinic system) | | |
Monoclinic lattice system
| Black-white (antisymmetric) 3D Bravais Lattice number 3 (Monoclinic system) | Black-white (antisymmetric) 3D Bravais Lattice number 4 (Monoclinic system) | Black-white (antisymmetric) 3D Bravais Lattice number 5 (Monoclinic system) | Black-white (antisymmetric) 3D Bravais Lattice number 6 (Monoclinic system) |
| Black-white (antisymmetric) 3D Bravais Lattice number 7 (Monoclinic system) | Black-white (antisymmetric) 3D Bravais Lattice number 8 (Monoclinic system) | Black-white (antisymmetric) 3D Bravais Lattice number 9 (Monoclinic system) | |
Orthorhombic lattice system
| Black-white (antisymmetric) 3D Bravais Lattice number 10 (Orthorhombic system) | Black-white (antisymmetric) 3D Bravais Lattice number 11a (Orthorhombic system) | Black-white (antisymmetric) 3D Bravais Lattice number 11b (Orthorhombic system) | Black-white (antisymmetric) 3D Bravais Lattice number 12a (Orthorhombic system) |
| Black-white (antisymmetric) 3D Bravais Lattice number 12b (Orthorhombic system) | Black-white (antisymmetric) 3D Bravais Lattice number 13 (Orthorhombic system) | Black-white (antisymmetric) 3D Bravais Lattice number 14a (Orthorhombic system) | Black-white (antisymmetric) 3D Bravais Lattice number 14b (Orthorhombic system) |
| Black-white (antisymmetric) 3D Bravais Lattice number 15a (Orthorhombic system) | Black-white (antisymmetric) 3D Bravais Lattice number 15b (Orthorhombic system) | Black-white (antisymmetric) 3D Bravais Lattice number 16a (Orthorhombic system) | Black-white (antisymmetric) 3D Bravais Lattice number 16b (Orthorhombic system) |
| Black-white (antisymmetric) 3D Bravais Lattice number 17a (Orthorhombic system) | Black-white (antisymmetric) 3D Bravais Lattice number 17b (Orthorhombic system) | Black-white (antisymmetric) 3D Bravais Lattice number 18 (Orthorhombic system) | Black-white (antisymmetric) 3D Bravais Lattice number 19 (Orthorhombic system) |
| Black-white (antisymmetric) 3D Bravais Lattice number 20 (Orthorhombic system) | Black-white (antisymmetric) 3D Bravais Lattice number 21 (Orthorhombic system) | | |
Tetragonal lattice system
| Black-white (antisymmetric) 3D Bravais Lattice number 22 (Tetragonal system) | Black-white (antisymmetric) 3D Bravais Lattice number 23 (Tetragonal system) | Black-white (antisymmetric) 3D Bravais Lattice number 24 (Tetragonal system) | Black-white (antisymmetric) 3D Bravais Lattice number 25 (Tetragonal system) |
| Black-white (antisymmetric) 3D Bravais Lattice number 26 (Tetragonal system) | Black-white (antisymmetric) 3D Bravais Lattice number 27 (Tetragonal system) | | |
Hexagonal crystal family
| Hexagonal lattice system | | Rhombohedral lattice system | |
| Black-white (antisymmetric) 3D Bravais Lattice number 28 (Hexagonal system) | Black-white (antisymmetric) 3D Bravais Lattice number 29 (Hexagonal system) | Black-white (antisymmetric) 3D Bravais Lattice number 30 (Rhombohedral system) | Black-white (antisymmetric) 3D Bravais Lattice number 31 (Rhombohedral system) |
Cubic lattice system
| Black-white (antisymmetric) 3D Bravais Lattice number 32 (Cubic system) | Black-white (antisymmetric) 3D Bravais Lattice number 33 (Cubic system) | Black-white (antisymmetric) 3D Bravais Lattice number 34 (Cubic system) | Black-white (antisymmetric) 3D Bravais Lattice number 35 (Cubic system) |
| Black-white (antisymmetric) 3D Bravais Lattice number 36 (Cubic system) | | | |

The table shows the 36 black-white Bravais lattices, including the 14 traditional Bravais lattices, but excluding the 14 gray lattices which look identical to the traditional lattices. The lattice symbols are those used for the traditional Bravais lattices. The suffix in the symbol indicates the mode of centering by the black (antisymmetry) points in the lattice, where s denotes edge centering.

=== Magnetic superspace groups ===
When the periodicity of the magnetic order coincides with the periodicity of crystallographic order, the magnetic phase is said to be commensurate, and can be well-described by a magnetic space group. However, when this is not the case, the order does not correspond to any magnetic space group. These phases can instead be described by magnetic superspace groups, which describe incommensurate order. This is the same formalism often used to describe the ordering of some quasicrystals.

== Phase transitions ==
The Landau theory of second-order phase transitions has been applied to magnetic phase transitions. The magnetic space group of disordered structure, $G_0$, transitions to the magnetic space group of the ordered phase, $G_1$. $G_1$ is a subgroup of $G_0$, and keeps only the symmetries which have not been broken during the phase transition. This can be tracked numerically by evolution of the order parameter, which belongs to a single irreducible representation of $G_0$.

Important magnetic phase transitions include the paramagnetic to ferromagnetic transition at the Curie temperature and the paramagnetic to antiferromagnetic transition at the Néel temperature. Differences in the magnetic phase transitions explain why Fe_{2}O_{3}, MnCO_{3}, and CoCO_{3} are weakly ferromagnetic, whereas the structurally similar Cr_{2}O_{3} and FeCO_{3} are purely antiferromagnetic. This theory developed into what is now known as antisymmetric exchange.

A related scheme is the classification of Aizu species which consist of a prototypical non-ferroic magnetic point group, the letter "F" for ferroic, and a ferromagnetic or ferroelectric point group which is a subgroup of the prototypical group which can be reached by continuous motion of the atoms in the crystal structure.

== Applications and extensions ==
The main application of these space groups is to magnetic structure, where the black/white lattice points correspond to spin up/spin down configuration of electron spin. More abstractly, the magnetic space groups are often thought of as representing time reversal symmetry. This is in contrast to time crystals, which instead have time translation symmetry. In the most general form, magnetic space groups can represent symmetries of any two valued lattice point property, such as positive/negative electrical charge or the alignment of electric dipole moments. The magnetic space groups place restrictions on the electronic band structure of materials. Specifically, they place restrictions on the connectivity of the different electron bands, which in turn defines whether material has symmetry-protected topological order. Thus, the magnetic space groups can be used to identify topological materials, such as topological insulators.

Experimentally, the main source of information about magnetic space groups is neutron diffraction experiments. The resulting experimental profile can be matched to theoretical structures by Rietveld refinement or simulated annealing.

Adding the two-valued symmetry is also a useful concept for frieze groups which are often used to classify artistic patterns. In that case, the 7 frieze groups with the addition of color reversal become 24 color-reversing frieze groups. Beyond the simple two-valued property, the idea has been extended further to two different types of antisymmetry (multiple antisymmetry), to three colors in three dimensions, and to even higher dimensions and more colors.

== See also ==
- Space group
- Magnetic structure
- Group theory
