= Vladimir Alexandrovich Koptsik =

Russian crystallographer and physicist

- Born: February 26, 1924
- Died: April 2, 2005 (aged 81)
- Education: Moscow State University
- Scientific career
- Institutions: Faculty of Physics of Moscow State University
- Academic advisors: A.V. Shubnikov

Vladimir Alexandrovich Koptsik (Russian: Владимир Александрович Копцик; 26 February 1924 – 2 April 2005) was a Soviet crystallographer and physicist. In 1966 Koptsik was the first to publish the complete atlas of all 1651 antisymmetry space groups. In 1972 he published Symmetry in Science and Art with extensive coverage of dichromatic and polychromatic symmetry.

== Life ==
=== Career ===
Koptsik was born on 26 February 1924 in Ivanovo. In 1941-1944 he worked as a turner in a defence plant in Moscow. Koptsik graduated from Moscow State University in 1949. He then began post-graduate work under the supervision of A.V. Shubnikov and submitted his candidate's dissertation in 1953.

In 1953 Koptsik was hired as an assistant to Shubnikov in the new department of Crystallography and Crystal Physics at MSU. He progressed through various positions, earning his doctorate in 1963, becoming full professor in 1967, and head of department from 1968 to 1974 succeeding Shubnikov.

Koptsik is known for his contributions to the physics of electrically and magnetically ordered crystals, the tensor representation of anisotropic media, the theory of crystal symmetry, and the symmetry aspects of structural phase transitions.

From 1966 Koptsik was a member of the Committee on International Crystallographic Tables of the International Union of Crystallography (IUCr); in 1983 he became a member of the subcommittee on nomenclature of n-dimensional crystallography.

=== Works ===
The majority of Koptsik's works were published in Russian. Books published by Koptsik:

- Shubnikov groups: handbook on the symmetry and physical properties of crystal structures (1966)
- Symmetry in Science and Art (1972); English translation (1974)
- Problem exercises for crystal physics (1982 and 1988)

Koptsik published 300 academic papers. Selected papers available in English:

- Polymorphic phase transitions and symmetry (1957)
- A general sketch of the development of the theory of symmetry and its applications in physical crystallography over the last 50 years (1968)
- Views of Aleksei Vasil'evich Shubnikov on crystallography and crystal physics (on the ninetieth anniversary of his birth) (1977)
- Symmetry principle in physics (1983)
- Generalized symmetry in crystal physics (1988)
- Symmetry bases. The contemporary symmetry theory in solids (1994)

=== Honours and awards ===
- E. S. Fedorov Prize of the Russian Academy of Sciences for his contributions to the theory of symmetry (1973)
- Honoured Professor of Moscow State University (1996)
- Honoured Scientist of the Russian Federation (1999)
