= Alexei Vasilievich Shubnikov =

Russian crystallographer and mathematician

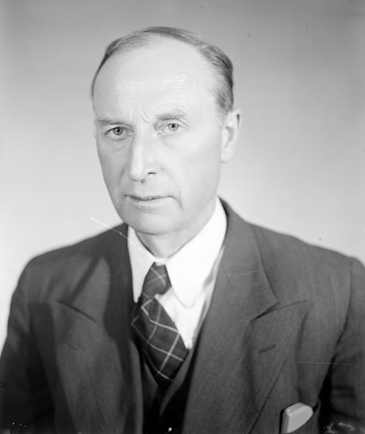
- Born: March 29, 1887
- Died: April 27, 1970 (aged 83)
- Education: Moscow State University
- Scientific career
- Institutions: Academy of Sciences of the Soviet Union

Alexei Vasilievich Shubnikov (Russian: Алексей Васильевич Шубников; 29 March 1887 – 27 April 1970) was a Soviet crystallographer and mathematician. Shubnikov was the founding director of the Institute of Crystallography (named after him following his death) of the Academy of Sciences of the Soviet Union in Moscow. Shubnikov pioneered Russian crystallography and its application.

== Life ==
=== Career ===
In 1912 Shubnikov graduated from the Department of Natural Sciences of the Faculty of Physics and Mathematics of Moscow University. From 1920 to 1925 he was a professor at the Ural Mining Institute, Yekaterinburg. In 1925, at the invitation of the mineralogist and geologist Alexander Fersman, he went to Leningrad, where he founded a laboratory of crystallography and laid the foundations of the Soviet school of theoretical and applied crystallography and related fields. From 1927 to 1929 he visited research institutions in Norway and Germany and worked temporarily with Friedrich Rinne. In 1934 he received a doctorate in the field of geological sciences. As part of a restructuring in the Academy of Sciences, he moved to Moscow with his laboratory in 1934. With the beginning of the German-Soviet war in 1941 it was transferred to the Sverdlovsk region, where research work on piezoelectricity continued. In 1943 he returned to Moscow with his laboratory, and in 1944 it was transformed into the Institute of Crystallography by a decision of the Presidium of the Academy of Sciences. Also in 1944 he first suggested the concept of multiple antisymmetry. In 1953 he founded the Department of Crystal Physics at the Physics Faculty of Lomonosov University and was a professor there until 1968. He served as director of the academy's Institute for Crystallography until 1962.

Shubnikov was a corresponding member of the Academy of Sciences of the USSR from 1933, and a full member and academician from 1953. Shubnikov was a co-founder of the International Union of Crystallography. Shubnikov was a foreign member of the Mineralogical Society of Great Britain and Ireland and of the Société française de minéralogie et de cristallographie.

He is known for his research in the 1950s on the Shubnikov groups named after him, with many applications in crystallography and solid-state physics, especially in the fields of magnetism and ferroelectricity. These groups were introduced by Heinrich Heesch in 1929 and are therefore also called Heesch-Shubnikov groups today.

=== Works ===
Shubnikov was the author of more than 250 scientific publications. His main works are devoted to the theory of symmetry, the theory of crystal growth, and the physical properties of crystals. He was the first to draw attention to piezoelectric textures, which predicted the possibility of visual observation of atoms and molecules when monochromatic rays pass through two superimposed crystal rasters, which has found application in the technique of modern electron microscopy. Having developed the doctrine of antisymmetry, he deduced the 58 crystallographic point groups of antisymmetry (Shubnikov groups). Selected works available in English:

- On the works of Pierre Curie on Symmetry. In: Usp. fiz. Nauk. Vol. 59, 1956, pp. 591–602. (Original Russian, English version 1988)
- Antisymmetry of textures. In: Soviet Physics Crystall. Vol. 3, No. 3, 1958, pp. 269–273. (Original Russian, English version 1988)
- Symmetry of similarity. In: Soviet Physics Crystall. Vol. 5, No. 4, 1961, pp. 469–476. (Original Russian, English version 1988)
- Autobiographical Data and Personal Reminiscences, In: P.P. Ewald (Ed.): Fifty Years of X-Ray Diffraction, Conference Proc., 25–31 July 1962, Munich, Germany
- Colored Symmetry (1964) with N.V. Belov. This book contains the first translation into English of Shubnikov's 1951 work Symmetry and antisymmetry of finite figures which opened up the field of antisymmetry in magnetic structures.
- Symmetry in Science and Art (1974) with V.A. Koptsik with extensive coverage of polychromatic symmetry (Original in Russian published by Nauka, Moscow 1972.)

=== Honours and awards ===
- Order of the Red Banner of Labour (1945, 1962)
- Stalin Prize for his monograph on piezoelectric textures (1947), and for the creation of equipment and technology for the production of rubies (1950)
- Order of Lenin (1953, 1967)
- Hero of Socialist Labour (1967)
