= Polychromatic symmetry =

Symmetry with three or more colours

Three-colour symmetry operation of colour group p3[3]_{1}

Polychromatic symmetry is a colour symmetry which interchanges three or more colours in a symmetrical pattern. It is a natural extension of dichromatic symmetry. The coloured symmetry groups are derived by adding to the position coordinates (x and y in two dimensions, x, y and z in three dimensions) an extra coordinate, k, which takes three or more possible values (colours).

An example of an application of polychromatic symmetry is crystals of substances containing molecules or ions in triplet states, that is with an electronic spin of magnitude 1, should sometimes have structures in which the spins of these groups have projections of + 1, 0 and -1 onto local magnetic fields. If these three cases are present with equal frequency in an orderly array, then the magnetic space group of such a crystal should be three-coloured.

== Example ==
The group p3 has three different rotation centres of order three (120°), but no reflections or glide reflections.

Uncoloured and 3-coloured p3 patterns
Uncoloured pattern p3	3-colour pattern p3[3]_{1}	3-colour pattern p3[3]_{2}

There are two distinct ways of colouring the p3 pattern with three colours: p3[3]_{1} and p3[3]_{2} where the figure in square brackets indicates the number of colours, and the subscript distinguishes between multiple cases of coloured patterns.

Taking a single motif in the pattern p3[3]_{1} it has a symmetry operation 3', consisting of a rotation by 120° and a cyclical permutation of the three colours white, green and red as shown in the animation.

This pattern p3[3]_{1} has the same colour symmetry as M. C. Escher's Hexagonal tessellation with animals: study of regular division of the plane with reptiles (1939). Escher reused the design in his 1943 lithograph Reptiles and it was also used as the cover art of Mott the Hoople’s debut album.

4-, 6-, 7-, 9- and 12-coloured p3 patterns
4 colours p3[4]	6 colours p3[6]	7 colours p3[7]	9 colours p3[9]_{1}	12 colours p3[12]_{1}

== Group theory ==
Initial research by Wittke and Garrido (1959) and by Niggli and Wondratschek (1960) identified the relation between the colour groups of an object and the subgroups of the object's geometric symmetry group. In 1961 van der Waerden and Burckhardt built on the earlier work by showing that colour groups can be defined as follows: in a colour group of a pattern (or object) each of its geometric symmetry operations s is associated with a permutation σ of the k colours in such a way that all the pairs (s,σ) form a group. Senechal showed that the permutations are determined by the subgroups of the geometric symmetry group G of the uncoloured pattern. When each symmetry operation in G is associated with a unique colour permutation the pattern is said to be perfectly coloured.

The Waerden-Burckhardt theory defines a k-colour group G(H) as being determined by a subgroup H of index k in the symmetry group G. If the subgroup H is a normal subgroup then the quotient group G/H permutes all the colours.

== History ==
- 1956 First papers on polychromatic, as opposed to dichromatic, symmetry groups are published by Belov and his co-workers. Vainshtein and Koptsik (1994) summarise the Russian work.
- 1957 Mackay publishes the first review of the Russian work in English. Subsequent reviews were published by Koptsik (1968), Schwarzenberger (1984), in Grünbaum and Shephard's Tilings and patterns (1987), by Senechal (1990) and by Thomas (2012).
- Late 1950s M.C. Escher's artworks based on dichromatic and polychromatic patterns popularise colour symmetry amongst scientists.
- 1961 Clear definition by van der Waerden and Burckhardt of colour symmetry in terms of group theory, regardless of the number of colours or dimensions involved.
- 1964 First publication of Shubnikov and Belov's Colored Symmetry in English translation
- 1971 Derivation by Loeb in Color and Symmetry of 2D colour symmetry configurations using rotocenters.
- 1974 Publication of Symmetry in Science and Art by Shubnikov and Koptsik with extensive coverage of polychromatic symmetry.
- 1983 Senechal examines the problem of colouring polyhedra symmetrically using group theory. Cromwell later uses an algorithmic counting approach (1997).
- 1988 Washburn and Crowe apply colour symmetry analysis to cultural patterns and objects. Washburn and Crowe inspired further work, for example by Makovicky.
- 1997 Lifshitz extends the theory of color symmetry from periodic to quasiperiodic crystals.
- 2008 Conway, Burgiel and Goodman-Strauss publish The Symmetries of Things which describes the colour-preserving symmetries of coloured objects using a new notation based on Orbifolds.

== Number of colour groups ==
Number of strip (frieze) k-colour groups for k ≤ 12
	Number of colours (k)										
Underlying group	2	3	4	5	6	7	8	9	10	11	12
p111	1	1	1	1	1	1	1	1	1	1	1
p1a1	1	1	1	1	1	1	1	1	1	1	1
p1m1	3	1	3	1	3	1	3	1	3	1	3
pm11	2	1	2	1	2	1	2	1	2	1	2
p112	2	1	2	1	2	1	2	1	2	1	2
pma2	3	1	3	1	3	1	3	1	3	1	3
pmm2	5	1	7	1	5	1	7	1	5	1	7
Total strip groups	17	7	19	7	17	7	19	7	17	7	19

Numbers of periodic (plane) k-colour groups for k ≤ 12
	Number of colours (k)										
Underlying group	2	3	4	5	6	7	8	9	10	11	12
p1	1	1	2	1	1	1	2	2	1	1	2
pg	2	2	4	2	5	2	7	3	6	2	11
pm	5	2	10	2	11	2	16	3	12	2	23
cm	3	2	7	2	7	2	13	3	8	2	17
p2	2	1	3	1	2	1	4	2	2	1	3
pgg	2	1	4	1	4	1	7	2	5	1	9
pmg	5	2	11	2	11	2	19	3	12	2	26
pmm	5	1	13	1	9	1	21	2	10	1	25
cmm	5	1	11	1	8	1	21	2	9	1	22
p3	-	2	1	-	1	1	-	3	-	-	4
p31m	1	2	1	-	5	-	1	3	-	-	7
p3m1	1	2	1	-	4	-	1	3	-	-	7
p4	2	-	5	1	2	-	9	1	4	-	9
p4g	3	-	7	-	2	-	13	1	3	-	10
p4m	5	-	13	-	2	-	28	1	3	-	16
p6	1	2	1	-	5	1	1	3	-	-	8
p6m	3	2	2	-	11	-	3	3	-	-	20
Total periodic groups	46	23	96	14	90	15	166	40	75	13	219

Both of the 3-colour p3 patterns, the unique 4-, 6-, 7-colour p3 patterns, one of the three 9-colour p3 patterns, and one of the four 12-colour p3 patterns are illustrated in the Example section above.
