= Nikolay Belov (geochemist) =

Soviet and Russian crystallographer, geochemist and academician

- Николай Белов
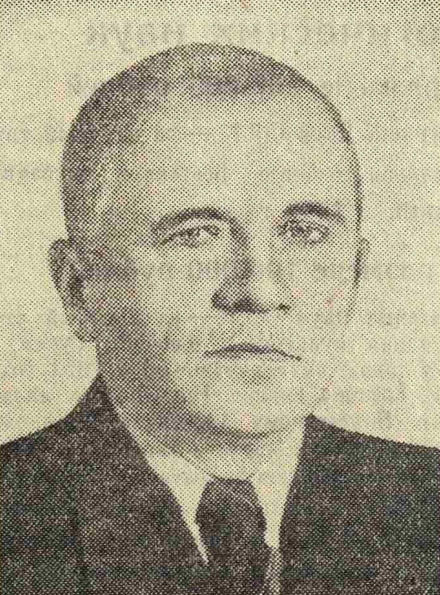
- Belov in 1952
- Born: Nikolay Vasilyevich Belov; December 14, 1891; Janów Lubelski, Lublin Governorate, Congress Poland, Russian Empire
- Died: March 6, 1982 (aged 90); Moscow, Soviet Union

Nikolay Vasilyevich Belov (Russian: Никола́й Васи́льевич Бело́в; December 14, 1891 – March 6, 1982) was a Soviet and Russian crystallographer, geochemist, academician (1953), and Hero of Socialist Labour (1969).

Belov worked primarily in the fields of mineralogy (particularly silicates), determination of crystal structures using X-ray crystallography, and the theory of symmetry, specifically dichromatic, and polychromatic symmetry, a field which Belov founded.

== Career ==
Belov’s career has been summarised in a number of jubilees and obituaries.

- 1921: graduated from the Polytechnic Institute of St. Petersburg with a degree in electrochemistry
- 1924: worked as a chemist/analyst at industrial laboratories in St. Petersburg
- 1928: directed the chemical laboratory of the Institute of Northern Studies in St. Petersburg
- 1933: researcher at the Lomonosov Institute of the Russian Academy of Sciences under Alexander Fersman
- 1936: researcher at the Institute of Crystallography of the USSR Academy of Sciences under Alexei Vasilievich Shubnikov
- 1936: translated Odd Hassel’s book Crystal chemistry from German into Russian
- 1938: became head of the structural department of the Shubnikov Institute of Crystallography RAS
- 1944: received doctorate for his thesis on the structure of ionic crystals and metallic phases
- 1946: appointed professor of crystallography and x-ray analysis at Gorky University
- 1953: appointed professor of crystallography and crystal chemistry at Moscow State University
- 1961: appointed head of the department of crystallography of Moscow State University
- 1966: elected President of the International Union of Crystallography

== Works ==
Belov was the author or co-author over 1400 academic works.

Books:

- The structure of ionic crystals and metallic phases (1947)
- Structural crystallography (1951)
- Colored Symmetry (1964)
- Essays on structural mineralogy (1976)
- Real crystal formation processes (1977)
- Aleksey Vasil'yevich Shubnikov (1984)

Belov’s scientific work on symmetry has been placed into historical context by V.A. Koptsik.

== Honours and awards ==
- Medal "For the Defence of Moscow" (1944)
- Medal "For Valiant Labour in the Great Patriotic War 1941–1945" (1946)
- Medal "In Commemoration of the 800th Anniversary of Moscow" (1948)
- First award of Fedorov Prize (USSR, 1948)
- Stalin Prize, first class for scientific work on the atomic structure of minerals (1952)
- Order of the Red Banner of Labour (1953)
- Four Orders of Lenin (1961, 1969, 1971, 1981)
- Gold Medal Exhibition of Economic Achievements of the USSR (1962)
- Lomonosov Gold Medal (highest award of the USSR Academy of Sciences) (1965)
- Medal "For Labour Valour" (1967)
- Hero of Socialist Labour (1969)
- Jubilee Medal "In Commemoration of the 100th Anniversary of the Birth of Vladimir Ilyich Lenin" (1970)
- K. Ohridski Medal, (Sofia University, Bulgaria, (1971)
- Lenin Prize for Essays on structural mineralogy (1974)
- Order of the October Revolution (1975)

== Organizational memberships ==
- First chairman of the National Committee of Soviet crystallographers (1955-1982)
- Corresponding member (1946) and then Academician of the Russian Academy of Sciences (1953)
- Editor of the Russian journal Kristallografija (translated into English as Soviet Physics - Crystallography) (1962)
- Honorary member of the All-Union Mineralogical Society (1964)
- Member of the Board (1954), Vice-President (1957-1963), and President (1966-1969) of the International Union of Crystallography
- Honorary member of the Mineralogical Society of America (1960), Mineralogical Society of Great Britain and Ireland, Société Française de Minéralogie et de Cristallographie (1969), Geological Society of the GDR (1975), American Crystallographic Association (1969)
- Honorary Doctor of University of Wrocław B. Bierut (Poland, 1975)
- Foreign member of the Polish Academy of Sciences (1978)
