= Arthur Lee Loeb =

Dutch scientist and crystallographer

Arthur Lee Loeb (13 July 1923, Amsterdam – 19 July 2002, Cambridge, Massachusetts) was a Dutch scientist and crystallographer.

== Life and career ==
Loeb arrived to the U.S. during World War II, completed his undergraduate studies at the University of Pennsylvania in 1944, and his Ph.D. in Chemical physics at Harvard University in 1949.

He taught at the Massachusetts Institute of Technology in the early part of his career. His life's work involved the articulation of a language of spatial patterns, which he refined while working as a research scientist at Kennecott Copper Co. research laboratory in Lexington, MA from 1962 to 1973.

Loeb later taught at Harvard, where he was senior lecturer in the Visual and Environmental Studies Department.

His language, which he described as "Visual Mathematics" and "Design Science," led to lifelong collaboration with innovators such as R. Buckminster Fuller and M.C. Escher.

Loeb was a founder and first Vice-President of the International Society for the Interdisciplinary Study of Symmetry (ISIS-Symmetry). He was later, until 2001, the Chairman of the Advisory Board.

Loeb and his wife, Charlotte Aarts Loeb (1921–2006) lived for many years in Cambridge, Massachusetts, and maintained a music room where they played Renaissance music, often with period instruments, and practiced Renaissance dance. This reflected Loeb's love for Renaissance music and its intricate patterns of dance.

The Rhode Island School of Design carries a collection on design science in his name.

He is buried at Mount Auburn Cemetery in Cambridge, Massachusetts, and his grave contains the inscription "Beloved teacher, scientist & musician."

== Selected books ==
- Color and Symmetry, Wiley-Interscience, 1971, ISBN 0-471-54335-7
- Space Structures: Their Harmony and Counterpoint, Addison-Wesley, 1976, ISBN 0-201-04650-4
- Concepts & Images: Visual Mathematics, Birkhäuser, 1993, ISBN 0-817-63620-X
