= Heinrich Heesch =

German mathematician (1906–1995)

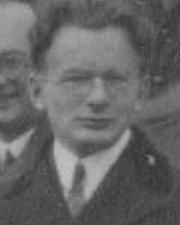
Heesch in 1930

Heinrich Heesch (June 25, 1906 – July 26, 1995) was a German mathematician. He was born in Kiel and died in Hanover.

In Göttingen, he worked on Group theory. In 1933, Heesch witnessed the National Socialist purges of university staff. Not willing to become a member of the National Socialist organization of university teachers as required, he resigned from his university position in 1935 and worked privately at his parents' home in Kiel until 1948.

During this time, he did research on tilings. In 1955, Heesch began teaching at Leibniz University Hannover and worked on graph theory. In this period, Heesch did pioneering work in developing methods for a computer-aided proof of the then unproved four color theorem. In particular, he was the first to investigate the notion of "discharging", which turned out to be a fundamental ingredient of the eventual computer-aided proof by Kenneth Appel and Wolfgang Haken.

Between 1967 and 1971, Heesch made several visits to the United States, where bigger and faster computers were available, working with Haken at University of Illinois at Urbana-Champaign and with Karl Durre and Yoshio Shimamoto at Brookhaven National Laboratory. During the crucial phase of his project, the German national research fund DFG cancelled financial support. After the 1977 success of Appel and Haken, Heesch worked on refining and shortening their proof, even after his retirement.

== Works ==
- Heinrich Heesch, Otto Kienzle: Flächenschluß. Berlin / Göttingen / Heidelberg: Springer-Verlag 1963
- Heinrich Heesch, Untersuchungen zum Vierfarbenproblem, Bibliographisches Institut, Mannheim 1969
- Bigalke, Hans-Günther (Hrsg.). Heinrich Heesch, Gesammelte Abhandlungen, Bad Salzdetfurth 1986.

== Literature on Heinrich Heesch's work ==
- Bigalke, Hans-Günther. Heinrich Heesch, Kristallgeometrie, Parkettierungen, Vierfarbenforschung, Basel 1988.

== See also ==
- Heesch's problem
