= Geoffrey Colin Shephard =

British mathematician (1927–2016)

Geoffrey Colin Shephard (16 August 1927 - 3 August 2016) was a British mathematician who worked on convex geometry and reflection groups. He asked Shephard's problem on the volumes of projected convex bodies, posed another problem on polyhedral nets, proved the Shephard–Todd theorem in invariant theory of finite groups, began the study of complex polytopes, and classified the complex reflection groups.

Shephard earned his Ph.D. in 1954 from Queens' College, Cambridge, under the supervision of J. A. Todd. He was a professor of mathematics at the University of East Anglia until his retirement.

== Selected publications ==
- Grünbaum, Branko; Shephard, Geoffrey Colin (1987), Tilings and Patterns, New York: W. H. Freeman, ISBN 978-0-7167-1193-3, MR 0857454
- McMullen, Peter; Shephard, Geoffrey Colin (1971), Convex Polytopes and the Upper Bound Conjecture, Cambridge University Press, ISBN 978-0-521-08017-0, MR 0301635
- Shephard, Geoffrey Colin (1972), Queens' College Dial: A Short Description of the Sun-dial in Queens' College, Cambridge, Self-published, ISBN 978-0-9503358-0-3
