= Rolph Ludwig Edward Schwarzenberger =

British mathematician

Rolph Ludwig Edward Schwarzenberger (7 February 1936 – 29 February 1992) was a British mathematician at the University of Warwick who worked on vector bundles (where he introduced jumping lines), crystallography, and mathematics education.

He was President of the Mathematical Association in 1983–1984.

== Publications ==
- Hirzebruch, Friedrich (1995) [1956], Schwarzenberger, R. L. E. (ed.), Topological methods in algebraic geometry, Classics in Mathematics, Berlin, New York: Springer-Verlag, ISBN 978-3-540-58663-0, MR 1335917 Schwarzenberger translated this book into English and added a long appendix on later developments.
- Schwarzenberger, R. L. E. (1972), Topics in differential topology, Publications of the Ramanujan Institute, vol. 3, Ramanujan Institute, University of Madras, Madras, MR 0405443
- Schwarzenberger, Rolf L. E. (1980), n-dimensional crystallography, Research Notes in Mathematics, vol. 41, Boston, Mass.: Pitman (Advanced Publishing Program), ISBN 978-0-8224-8468-4, MR 0586945
- Schwarzenberger, R. L. E. (1984), "The importance of mistakes: the 1984 presidential address", The Mathematical Gazette, 68 (445): 159–172, doi:10.2307/3616337, ISSN 0025-5572, JSTOR 3616337, MR 0769804
