= Iron(II) selenide =

Names
- IUPAC name Iron(II) selenide

Identifiers
CAS Number	1310-32-3
3D model (JSmol)	Interactive image
ChemSpider	14262536
ECHA InfoCard	100.013.798
EC Number	215-177-1
PubChem CID	14795
UNII	64EUH87C9Z
CompTox Dashboard (EPA)	DTXSID1061653
- InChI: InChI=1S/Fe.Se Key: WALCGGIJOOWJIN-UHFFFAOYSA-N
- SMILES: [Fe]=[Se]

Properties
Chemical formula	FeSe
Molar mass	134.807 g/mol
Appearance	black crystals
Density	4.72 g/cm^{3}
Melting point	965 °C (1,769 °F; 1,238 K)
Solubility in water	0.975 mg/100mL

Structure
Crystal structure	hexagonal / tetragonal

Hazards
- Occupational safety and health (OHS/OSH)
Main hazards	toxic
- GHS labelling
Pictograms	(GHS06: Toxic)
Signal word	Danger
Hazard statements	H301, H331, H373, H410
Precautionary statements	P260, P264, P270, P271, P273, P301+P316, P304+P340, P316, P319, P321, P330, P391, P403+P233, P405, P501

Related compounds
Other anions	Iron(II) oxide Iron(II) sulfide Iron(II) telluride
Other cations	Manganese(II) selenide Cobalt(II) selenide
- Except where otherwise noted, data are given for materials in their standard state (at 25 °C [77 °F], 100 kPa). Infobox references

Iron(II) selenide refers to a number of inorganic compounds of ferrous iron and selenide (Se^{2−}). The phase diagram of the system Fe–Se reveals the existence of several non-stoichiometric phases between ~49 at. % Se and ~53 at. % Fe, and temperatures up to ~450 °C. The low temperature stable phases are the tetragonal PbO-structure (P4/nmm) β-Fe_{1−x}Se and α-Fe_{7}Se_{8}. The high temperature phase is the hexagonal, NiAs structure (P6_{3}/mmc) δ-Fe_{1−x}Se. Iron(II) selenide occurs naturally as the NiAs-structure mineral achavalite.

More selenium rich iron selenide phases are the γ phases (γ and γˈ), assigned the Fe_{3}Se_{4} stoichiometry, and FeSe_{2}, which occurs as the marcasite-structure natural mineral ferroselite, or the rare pyrite-structure mineral dzharkenite.

It is used in electrical semiconductors.

== Superconductivity ==
β-FeSe is the simplest iron-based superconductor but with diverse properties. It starts to superconduct at 8 K at normal pressure but its critical temperature (T_{c}) is dramatically increased to 38 K under pressure, by means of intercalation, or after quenching at high pressures. The combination of both intercalation and pressure results in re-emerging superconductivity at 48 K.

In 2013 it was reported that a single atomic layer of FeSe epitaxially grown on SrTiO_{3} is superconductive with a then-record transition temperature for iron-based superconductors of 70 K. This discovery has attracted significant attention and in 2014 a superconducting transition temperature of over 100K was reported for this system.
