= COSE =

COSE or CoSe may refer to:

- Common Open Software Environment, a 1993 Unix initiative
- Council of Smaller Enterprises, a business advocacy organization in Northeast Ohio
- Carbonyl selenide, a chemical compound with the formula COSe
- Cobalt(II) selenide, a chemical compound with the formula CoSe
- CBOR Object Signing and Encryption, security standards for the CBOR data format
