= Breithauptite =

Nickel antimonide mineral

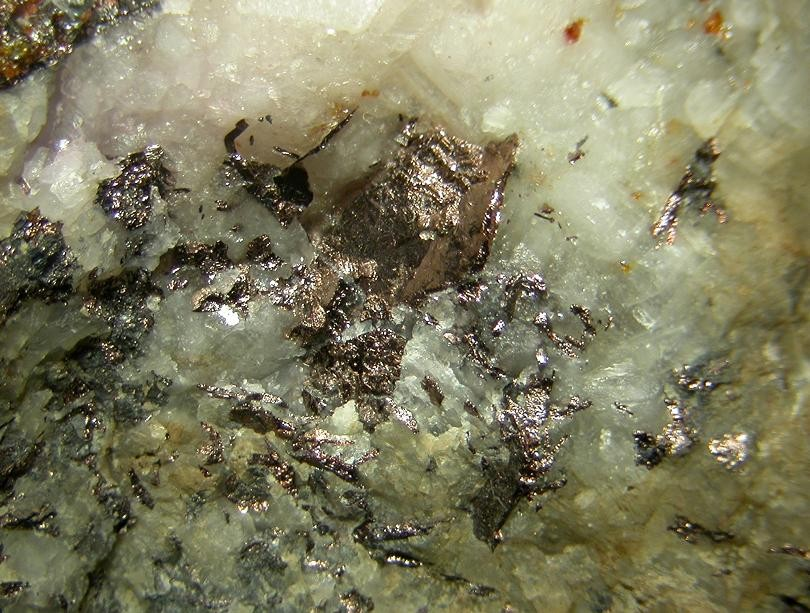
- Breithauptite on calcite from the Samson Mine, St Andreasberg, Harz Mountains, Lower Saxony, Germany (Field of view 17 mm)

General
- Category: Antimonide mineral
- Formula: nickel antimonide (NiSb)
- IMA symbol: Bhp
- Strunz classification: 2.CC.05
- Crystal system: Hexagonal
- Crystal class: Dihexagonal dipyramidal (6/mmm); H-M symbol: (6/m 2/m 2/m)
- Space group: P6_{3}/mmc
- Unit cell: a = 3.946 Å, c = 5.148 Å, Z = 2

Identification
- Color: Pale copper-red, may be with violet tint
- Crystal habit: Crystals rare, thin tabular or needlelike, to 1 mm; arborescent, disseminated, massive
- Twinning: Twin plane {101̅1}
- Cleavage: None
- Fracture: Subconchoidal to uneven
- Tenacity: Brittle
- Mohs scale hardness: 5.5
- Luster: Metallic
- Streak: Reddish brown
- Diaphaneity: Opaque
- Specific gravity: 7.591–8.23 measured; 8.629 calculated
- Pleochroism: Very distinct

Breithauptite is a nickel antimonide mineral with the simple formula NiSb. Breithauptite is a metallic opaque copper-red mineral crystallizing in the hexagonal - dihexagonal dipyramidal crystal system. It is typically massive to reniform in habit, but is observed as tabular crystals. It has a Mohs hardness of 3.5 to 4 and a specific gravity of 8.23.

It occurs in hydrothermal calcite veins associated with cobalt–nickel–silver ores.

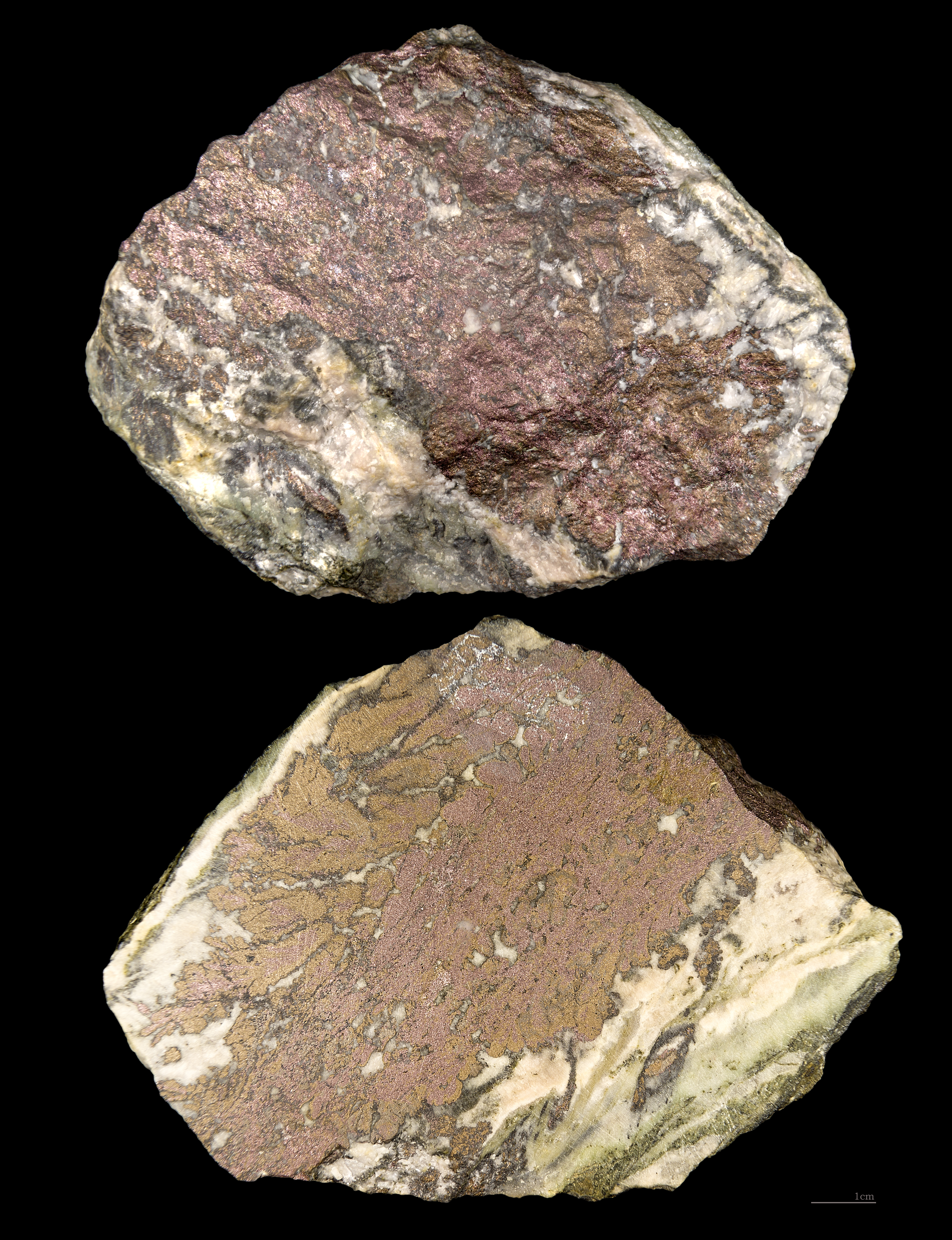
Massive breithauptite with orange-brown nickeline and minor quartz from the Cobalt area of Ontario, Canada

It was first described in 1840 from the Harz Mountains, Lower Saxony, Germany, and in 1845 for occurrences in the Cobalt and Thunder Bay districts of Ontario, Canada. It was named to honor Saxon mineralogist Johann Friedrich August Breithaupt (1791–1873).

== See also ==
- List of minerals
- List of minerals named after people
