= Ammonium selenide =

Names
- Other names: Dimmonium selenide

Identifiers
CAS Number	66455-76-3
3D model (JSmol)	Interactive image
ChemSpider	129558039
PubChem CID	15528384
CompTox Dashboard (EPA)	DTXSID701336768
- InChI: InChI=1S/2H3N.Se/h2*1H3;/q;;-2/p+2 Key: JISUIHCFTLLJLJ-UHFFFAOYSA-P
- SMILES: [NH4+].[NH4+].[Se-2]

Properties
Chemical formula	(NH_{4})_{2}Se
Molar mass	115.05 g/mol
Appearance	White solid
Solubility in water	Reacts
Solubility	Soluble in sodium hydroxide

Structure
Crystal structure	Orthorhombic

Related compounds
Other anions	Ammonium sulfide
- Except where otherwise noted, data are given for materials in their standard state (at 25 °C [77 °F], 100 kPa). Infobox references

Ammonium selenide is a chemical compound with the symbol (NH_{4})_{2}Se. It is claimed to be a white solid and there is little to no spectroscopic evidence on this compound.

== Preparation ==
It was first claimed to be prepared in 1898 by reacting concentrated ammonia and hydrogen selenide gas. However, this has been disproved in 1926 as it was shown that ammonium selenide was unstable in water. Instead, ammonium selenide was produced by the reaction of anhydrous ammonia and hydrogen selenide gas (made from the reaction of iron(II) selenide and hydrochloric acid). However, there is no X-ray crystallography on this compound.

== Reactions ==
Ammonium selenide reacts with water and various acids. For example, it reacts with nitric acid to form selenous acid. It also reacts with various metals, such as calcium, to produce their respective selenides.
