= Tantite =

Tantalum oxide mineral

General
- Category: Oxide minerals
- Formula: Ta_{2}O_{5}
- IMA symbol: Tan
- Strunz classification: 4.EA.05
- Dana classification: 04.06.06.01
- Crystal system: Triclinic
- Crystal class: Pedial (1) (same H-M symbol)
- Space group: P1
- Unit cell: a = 3.8 Å, b = 3.79 Å c = 35.74 Å; β = 90.18°; Z = 6

Identification
- Formula mass: 441.89 g/mol
- Color: Colorless
- Cleavage: None
- Mohs scale hardness: 7
- Luster: Adamantine
- Streak: White
- Diaphaneity: Transparent
- Specific gravity: 8.55
- Density: 8.45 g/cm^{3}
- Optical properties: Biaxial

Tantite is a rare tantalum oxide mineral with formula: Ta_{2}O_{5}. Tantite forms transparent microscopic colorless triclinic - pedial crystals with an adamantine luster. It has a Mohs hardness of 7 and a high specific gravity of 8.45. Chemical analyses show minor inclusion (1.3%) of niobium oxide.

It was first described in 1983 for an occurrence in a pegmatite in the Kola Peninsula, Russia. It has also been reported from a pegmatite complex in Florence County, Wisconsin. Associated mineral species include elbaite, lepidolite, spodumene, columbite-tantalite, wodginite, and microlite.
