= Crystallographic point group =

Classification system for crystals

In crystallography, a crystallographic point group is a point group whose symmetry operations are compatible with the translational symmetry of crystallographic lattices. According to the crystallographic restriction theorem, point groups may only contain one-, two-, three-, four- and sixfold rotational symmetries. This reduces the number of crystallographic point groups to 10 in 2-dimensional space and 32 in 3-dimensional space.

In the classification of crystals, to each space group is associated a crystallographic point group by "forgetting" the translational components of the symmetry operations, that is, by turning screw rotations into rotations, glide reflections into reflections and moving all symmetry elements into the origin. Each crystallographic point group defines the (geometric) crystal class of the crystal.

The point group of a crystal determines, among other things, the directional variation of physical properties that arise from its structure, including optical properties such as birefringency, or electro-optical features such as the Pockels effect.

== Graphical representations ==
A table displaying the stereographic projections of the 32 crystallographic point groups organized by crystal system, principle rotation axis and additional symmetries. The Schoenflies notation for the group is marked in the bottom left while the Hermann–Mauguin notation is displayed in the bottom right. Laue groups are labeled in the top right of each cell. The cubic point groups have additional lines marking great circles as a guide to the eye.

It is common to display point groups graphically to develop an intuitive understanding of their symmetry. Typically stereographic projections are used as they preserve angular relations. Two types of projections can be made. The first, shown here, is a projection of the symmetry elements, to display their angular relations with respect to one another. In this case, each symmetry element is represented by a symbol shown in the table below. Thin lines are used to demarcate the sphere of the stereographic projection, and axes of rotation or rotoinversion where they do not intersect with a mirror plane. Mirror planes are represented by bold lines. The second type of projection, is of a general point, and all the additional points generated from that initial point using the symmetry elements of the point group.

Symmetry Element	graphical representation
2	
3	
4	
6	
1̅=i	
2̅=m	Mirror planes out of page are given by bold lines
3̅	
4̅	
6̅	

== In two dimensions ==
=== Hermann–Mauguin notation ===
An abbreviated form of the Hermann–Mauguin notation commonly used for wallpaper groups also serves to describe crystallographic point groups. In 2-dimensional space, group names are

Crystal system	Required symmetries	10 crystal classes (Hermann-Mauguin)			
Crystal system	Required symmetries	Cyclic		Dihedral	
Oblique (monoclinic)	None	1	2		
Rectangular (orthorhombic)	1 mirror line			m	2mm
Square (tetragonal)	1 fourfold axis of rotation		4		4mm
Hexagonal	1 threefold or sixfold axis of rotation	3	6	3m	6mm

=== Schoenflies notation ===
In Schoenflies notation, point groups are denoted by a letter symbol with a subscript. The symbols used in crystallography mean the following:

- C_{n} (for cyclic) indicates that the group has an n-fold rotation axis.
- D_{n} (for dihedral, or two-sided) indicates that the group has an n-fold rotation axis plus n twofold axes perpendicular to that axis.

n	1	2	3	4	6
C_{n}	C_{1}	C_{2}	C_{3}	C_{4}	C_{6}
D_{n}	D_{1}	D_{2}	D_{3}	D_{4}	D_{6}

== In three dimensions ==
The 32 point groups are the same as the 32 types of morphological (external) crystalline symmetries derived in 1830 by Johann Friedrich Christian Hessel from a consideration of observed crystal forms. In 1867 Axel Gadolin, who was unaware of the previous work of Hessel, found the crystallographic point groups independently using stereographic projection to represent the symmetry elements of the 32 groups.

Crystal family	Crystal system	Point group / Crystal class	Hermann–Mauguin	Point symmetry	Order	Abstract group
triclinic		pedial	1	enantiomorphic polar	1	trivial $\mathbb{Z}_1$
triclinic		pinacoidal	1̅	centrosymmetric	2	cyclic $\mathbb{Z}_2$
monoclinic		sphenoidal	2	enantiomorphic polar	2	cyclic $\mathbb{Z}_2$
monoclinic		domatic	m	polar	2	cyclic $\mathbb{Z}_2$
monoclinic		prismatic	2/m	centrosymmetric	4	Klein four $\mathbb{V} = \mathbb{Z}_2\times\mathbb{Z}_2$
orthorhombic		rhombic-disphenoidal	222	enantiomorphic	4	Klein four $\mathbb{V} = \mathbb{Z}_2\times\mathbb{Z}_2$
orthorhombic		rhombic-pyramidal	mm2	polar	4	Klein four $\mathbb{V} = \mathbb{Z}_2\times\mathbb{Z}_2$
orthorhombic		rhombic-dipyramidal	mmm (2/m 2/m 2/m)	centrosymmetric	8	$\mathbb{V}\times\mathbb{Z}_2$
tetragonal		tetragonal-pyramidal	4	enantiomorphic polar	4	cyclic $\mathbb{Z}_4$
tetragonal		tetragonal-disphenoidal	4̅	non-centrosymmetric	4	cyclic $\mathbb{Z}_4$
tetragonal		tetragonal-dipyramidal	4/m	centrosymmetric	8	$\mathbb{Z}_4\times\mathbb{Z}_2$
tetragonal		tetragonal-trapezohedral	422	enantiomorphic	8	dihedral $\mathbb{D}_8 = \mathbb{Z}_4\rtimes\mathbb{Z}_2$
tetragonal		ditetragonal-pyramidal	4mm	polar	8	dihedral $\mathbb{D}_8 = \mathbb{Z}_4\rtimes\mathbb{Z}_2$
tetragonal		tetragonal-scalenohedral	4̅2m	non-centrosymmetric	8	dihedral $\mathbb{D}_8 = \mathbb{Z}_4\rtimes\mathbb{Z}_2$
tetragonal		ditetragonal-dipyramidal	4/mmm (4/m 2/m 2/m)	centrosymmetric	16	$\mathbb{D}_8\times\mathbb{Z}_2$
hexagonal	trigonal	trigonal-pyramidal	3	enantiomorphic polar	3	cyclic $\mathbb{Z}_3$
hexagonal	trigonal	rhombohedral	3̅	centrosymmetric	6	cyclic $\mathbb{Z}_6 = \mathbb{Z}_3\times\mathbb{Z}_2$
hexagonal	trigonal	trigonal-trapezohedral	32	enantiomorphic	6	dihedral $\mathbb{D}_6 = \mathbb{Z}_3\rtimes\mathbb{Z}_2$
hexagonal	trigonal	ditrigonal-pyramidal	3m	polar	6	dihedral $\mathbb{D}_6 = \mathbb{Z}_3\rtimes\mathbb{Z}_2$
hexagonal	trigonal	ditrigonal-scalenohedral	3̅m (3̅ 2/m)	centrosymmetric	12	dihedral $\mathbb{D}_{12} = \mathbb{Z}_6\rtimes\mathbb{Z}_2$
hexagonal	hexagonal	hexagonal-pyramidal	6	enantiomorphic polar	6	cyclic $\mathbb{Z}_6 = \mathbb{Z}_3\times\mathbb{Z}_2$
hexagonal	hexagonal	trigonal-dipyramidal	6̅	non-centrosymmetric	6	cyclic $\mathbb{Z}_6 = \mathbb{Z}_3\times\mathbb{Z}_2$
hexagonal	hexagonal	hexagonal-dipyramidal	6/m	centrosymmetric	12	$\mathbb{Z}_6\times\mathbb{Z}_2$
hexagonal	hexagonal	hexagonal-trapezohedral	622	enantiomorphic	12	dihedral $\mathbb{D}_{12} = \mathbb{Z}_6\rtimes\mathbb{Z}_2$
hexagonal	hexagonal	dihexagonal-pyramidal	6mm	polar	12	dihedral $\mathbb{D}_{12} = \mathbb{Z}_6\rtimes\mathbb{Z}_2$
hexagonal	hexagonal	ditrigonal-dipyramidal	6̅m2	non-centrosymmetric	12	dihedral $\mathbb{D}_{12} = \mathbb{Z}_6\rtimes\mathbb{Z}_2$
hexagonal	hexagonal	dihexagonal-dipyramidal	6/mmm (6/m 2/m 2/m)	centrosymmetric	24	$\mathbb{D}_{12}\times\mathbb{Z}_2$
cubic		tetartoidal	23	enantiomorphic	12	alternating $\mathbb{A}_4$
cubic		diploidal	m3̅ (2/m 3)	centrosymmetric	24	$\mathbb{A}_4\times\mathbb{Z}_2$
cubic		gyroidal	432	enantiomorphic	24	symmetric $\mathbb{S}_4$
cubic		hextetrahedral	4̅3m	non-centrosymmetric	24	symmetric $\mathbb{S}_4$
cubic		hexoctahedral	m3̅m (4/m 3 2/m)	centrosymmetric	48	$\mathbb{S}_4\times\mathbb{Z}_2$

The point symmetry of a structure can be further described as follows. Consider the points that make up the structure, and reflect them all through a single point, so that (x,y,z) becomes (−x,−y,−z). This is the 'inverted structure'. If the original structure and inverted structure are identical, then the structure is centrosymmetric. Otherwise it is non-centrosymmetric. Still, even in the non-centrosymmetric case, the inverted structure can in some cases be rotated to align with the original structure. This is a non-centrosymmetric achiral structure. If the inverted structure cannot be rotated to align with the original structure, then the structure is chiral or enantiomorphic and its symmetry group is enantiomorphic.

A direction (meaning a line without an arrow) is called polar if its two-directional senses are geometrically or physically different. A symmetry direction of a crystal that is polar is called a polar axis. Groups containing a polar axis are called polar. A polar crystal possesses a unique polar axis (more precisely, all polar axes are parallel). Some geometrical or physical property is different at the two ends of this axis: for example, there might develop a dielectric polarization as in pyroelectric crystals. A polar axis can occur only in non-centrosymmetric structures. There cannot be a mirror plane or twofold axis perpendicular to the polar axis, because they would make the two directions of the axis equivalent.

The crystal structures of chiral biological molecules (such as protein structures) can only occur in the 65 enantiomorphic space groups (biological molecules are usually chiral).

=== Hermann–Mauguin notation ===
An abbreviated form of the Hermann–Mauguin notation commonly used for space groups also serves to describe crystallographic point groups. In 3-dimensional space, group names are

Crystal family	Crystal system	Required symmetries	32 crystal classes (Hermann-Mauguin)						
Crystal family	Crystal system	Required symmetries	Primitive	Inverse	Central	Axial	Planar	Inverse-planar	Planar-axial
Triclinic		None	1	1̅					
Monoclinic		1 twofold axis of rotation or 1 mirror plane	2	m	^{2}/_{m}				
Orthorhombic		3 twofold axes of rotation or 1 twofold axis of rotation and 2 mirror planes				222	mm2		mmm
Tetragonal		1 fourfold axis of rotation	4	4̅	^{4}/_{m}	422	4mm	4̅2m	4/mmm
Hexagonal	Trigonal	1 threefold axis of rotation	3	3̅		32	3m	3̅m	
Hexagonal	Hexagonal	1 sixfold axis of rotation	6	6̅	^{6}/_{m}	622	6mm	6̅m2	6/mmm
Cubic		4 threefold axes of rotation	23		m3̅	432		4̅3m	m3̅m

=== Schoenflies notation ===
In Schoenflies notation, point groups are denoted by a letter symbol with a subscript. The symbols used in crystallography mean the following:

- C_{n} (for cyclic) indicates that the group has an n-fold rotation axis.
  - C_{nh} is C_{n} with the addition of a mirror (reflection) plane perpendicular to the axis of rotation.
  - C_{nv} is C_{n} with the addition of n mirror planes parallel to the axis of rotation.
- S_{2n} (for Spiegel, German for mirror) denotes a group with only a 2n-fold rotation-reflection axis.
- D_{n} (for dihedral, or two-sided) indicates that the group has an n-fold rotation axis plus n twofold axes perpendicular to that axis.
  - D_{nh} has, in addition, a mirror plane perpendicular to the n-fold axis.
  - D_{nd} has, in addition to the elements of D_{n}, mirror planes parallel to the n-fold axis.
- The letter T (for tetrahedron) indicates that the group has the symmetry of a tetrahedron. T_{d} includes improper rotation operations, T excludes improper rotation operations, and T_{h} is T with the addition of an inversion.
- The letter O (for octahedron) indicates that the group has the symmetry of an octahedron, with (O_{h}) or without (O) improper operations (those that change handedness).

n	1	2	3	4	6
C_{n}	C_{1}	C_{2}	C_{3}	C_{4}	C_{6}
C_{nv}	C_{1v}=C_{1h}	C_{2v}	C_{3v}	C_{4v}	C_{6v}
C_{nh}	C_{1h}	C_{2h}	C_{3h}	C_{4h}	C_{6h}
D_{n}	D_{1}=C_{2}	D_{2}	D_{3}	D_{4}	D_{6}
D_{nh}	D_{1h}=C_{2v}	D_{2h}	D_{3h}	D_{4h}	D_{6h}
D_{nd}	D_{1d}=C_{2h}	D_{2d}	D_{3d}	D_{4d}	D_{6d}
S_{2n}	S_{2}	S_{4}	S_{6}	S_{8}	S_{12}

D_{4d} and D_{6d} are actually forbidden because they contain improper rotations with n=8 and 12 respectively. The 27 point groups in the table plus T, T_{d}, T_{h}, O and O_{h} constitute 32 crystallographic point groups.

=== Correspondence between different notations ===
Crystal family	Crystal system	Hermann-Mauguin		Shubnikov	Schoenflies	Orbifold	Coxeter	Order
Crystal family	Crystal system	(full)	(short)	Shubnikov	Schoenflies	Orbifold	Coxeter	Order
Triclinic		1	1	$1\$	C_{1}	11	[ ]^{+}	1
Triclinic		1̅	1̅	$\tilde{2}$	C_{i} = S_{2}	×	[2^{+},2^{+}]	2
Monoclinic		2	2	$2\$	C_{2}	22	[2]^{+}	2
Monoclinic		m	m	$m\$	C_{s} = C_{1h}	*	[ ]	2
Monoclinic		$\tfrac{2}{m}$	2/m	$2:m\$	C_{2h}	2*	[2,2^{+}]	4
Orthorhombic		222	222	$2:2\$	D_{2} = V	222	[2,2]^{+}	4
Orthorhombic		mm2	mm2	$2 \cdot m\$	C_{2v}	*22	[2]	4
Orthorhombic		$\tfrac{2}{m}\tfrac{2}{m}\tfrac{2}{m}$	mmm	$m \cdot 2:m\$	D_{2h} = V_{h}	*222	[2,2]	8
Tetragonal		4	4	$4\$	C_{4}	44	[4]^{+}	4
Tetragonal		4̅	4̅	$\tilde{4}$	S_{4}	2×	[2^{+},4^{+}]	4
Tetragonal		$\tfrac{4}{m}$	4/m	$4:m\$	C_{4h}	4*	[2,4^{+}]	8
Tetragonal		422	422	$4:2\$	D_{4}	422	[4,2]^{+}	8
Tetragonal		4mm	4mm	$4 \cdot m\$	C_{4v}	*44	[4]	8
Tetragonal		4̅2m	4̅2m	$\tilde{4}\cdot m$	D_{2d} = V_{d}	2*2	[2^{+},4]	8
Tetragonal		$\tfrac{4}{m}\tfrac{2}{m}\tfrac{2}{m}$	4/mmm	$m \cdot 4:m\$	D_{4h}	*422	[4,2]	16
Hexagonal	Trigonal	3	3	$3\$	C_{3}	33	[3]^{+}	3
Hexagonal	Trigonal	3̅	3̅	$\tilde{6}$	C_{3i} = S_{6}	3×	[2^{+},6^{+}]	6
Hexagonal	Trigonal	32	32	$3:2\$	D_{3}	322	[3,2]^{+}	6
Hexagonal	Trigonal	3m	3m	$3 \cdot m\$	C_{3v}	*33	[3]	6
Hexagonal	Trigonal	3̅$\tfrac{2}{m}$	3̅m	$\tilde{6}\cdot m$	D_{3d}	2*3	[2^{+},6]	12
Hexagonal	Hexagonal	6	6	$6\$	C_{6}	66	[6]^{+}	6
Hexagonal	Hexagonal	6̅	6̅	$3:m\$	C_{3h}	3*	[2,3^{+}]	6
Hexagonal	Hexagonal	$\tfrac{6}{m}$	6/m	$6:m\$	C_{6h}	6*	[2,6^{+}]	12
Hexagonal	Hexagonal	622	622	$6:2\$	D_{6}	622	[6,2]^{+}	12
Hexagonal	Hexagonal	6mm	6mm	$6 \cdot m\$	C_{6v}	*66	[6]	12
Hexagonal	Hexagonal	6̅m2	6̅m2	$m \cdot 3:m\$	D_{3h}	*322	[3,2]	12
Hexagonal	Hexagonal	$\tfrac{6}{m}\tfrac{2}{m}\tfrac{2}{m}$	6/mmm	$m \cdot 6:m\$	D_{6h}	*622	[6,2]	24
Cubic		23	23	$3/2\$	T	332	[3,3]^{+}	12
Cubic		$\tfrac{2}{m}$3̅	m3̅	$\tilde{6}/2$	T_{h}	3*2	[3^{+},4]	24
Cubic		432	432	$3/4\$	O	432	[4,3]^{+}	24
Cubic		4̅3m	4̅3m	$3/\tilde{4}$	T_{d}	*332	[3,3]	24
Cubic		$\tfrac{4}{m}$3̅$\tfrac{2}{m}$	m3̅m	$\tilde{6}/4$	O_{h}	*432	[4,3]	48

=== Isomorphisms ===
Two groups are said to be isomorphic if there exists a bijective and homomorphic mapping between the two groups. That is to say that simply renaming the elements of one group with the elements of the second group in the right manner will give you the second group and visa versa. Many of the crystallographic point groups share the same internal structure in this sense. For example, the point groups 1̅, 2, and m contain different geometric symmetry operations, (inversion, rotation, and reflection, respectively) but all share the structure of the cyclic group C_{2}. All isomorphic groups are of the same order, but not all groups of the same order are isomorphic. The point groups which are isomorphic are shown in the following table:

Hermann–Mauguin	Schoenflies	Order	Abstract group	
1	C_{1}	1	C_{1}	$G_1^1$
1̅	C_{i} = S_{2}	2	C_{2}	$G_2^1$
2	C_{2}	2	C_{2}	$G_2^1$
m	C_{s} = C_{1h}	2	C_{2}	$G_2^1$
3	C_{3}	3	C_{3}	$G_3^1$
4	C_{4}	4	C_{4}	$G_4^1$
4̅	S_{4}	4	C_{4}	$G_4^1$
2/m	C_{2h}	4	D_{2} = C_{2} × C_{2}	$G_4^2$
222	D_{2} = V	4	D_{2} = C_{2} × C_{2}	$G_4^2$
mm2	C_{2v}	4	D_{2} = C_{2} × C_{2}	$G_4^2$
3̅	C_{3i} = S_{6}	6	C_{6}	$G_6^1$
6	C_{6}	6	C_{6}	$G_6^1$
6̅	C_{3h}	6	C_{6}	$G_6^1$
32	D_{3}	6	D_{3}	$G_6^2$
3m	C_{3v}	6	D_{3}	$G_6^2$
mmm	D_{2h} = V_{h}	8	D_{2} × C_{2}	$G_8^3$
4/m	C_{4h}	8	C_{4} × C_{2}	$G_8^2$
422	D_{4}	8	D_{4}	$G_8^4$
4mm	C_{4v}	8	D_{4}	$G_8^4$
4̅2m	D_{2d} = V_{d}	8	D_{4}	$G_8^4$
6/m	C_{6h}	12	C_{6} × C_{2}	$G_{12}^2$
23	T	12	A_{4}	$G_{12}^5$
3̅m	D_{3d}	12	D_{6}	$G_{12}^3$
622	D_{6}	12	D_{6}	$G_{12}^3$
6mm	C_{6v}	12	D_{6}	$G_{12}^3$
6̅m2	D_{3h}	12	D_{6}	$G_{12}^3$
4/mmm	D_{4h}	16	D_{4} × C_{2}	$G_{16}^9$
6/mmm	D_{6h}	24	D_{6} × C_{2}	$G_{24}^5$
m3̅	T_{h}	24	A_{4} × C_{2}	$G_{24}^{10}$
432	O	24	S_{4}	$G_{24}^{7}$
4̅3m	T_{d}	24	S_{4}	$G_{24}^{7}$
m3̅m	O_{h}	48	S_{4} × C_{2}	$G_{48}^7$

This table makes use of cyclic groups (C_{1}, C_{2}, C_{3}, C_{4}, C_{6}), dihedral groups (D_{2}, D_{3}, D_{4}, D_{6}), one of the alternating groups (A_{4}), and one of the symmetric groups (S_{4}). Here the symbol " × " indicates a direct product.

== Symmetry in understanding crystal properties ==
The symmetry of a material can have profound effects on what properties are 'allowed' to be displayed by that crystal. These influences are summarized in Von Neumann's principle and more generally by the Curie Law's. These laws state that the symmetry of a crystals physical properties must be at least as symmetric as the crystal itself. A common example given is in piezoelectricity and pyroelectricity. These properties generate an electric dipole in a crystal under strain or thermal changes. An electric dipole is directional and as such cannot exist in crystals with inversion symmetry. The converse, however, is not true. Crystals without inversion symmetry do not necessarily display piezo- or pyro-electricity.

=== Symmetry in Polycrystals ===
Polycrystals contain many small crystals of different orientations. In an idealized case, with sufficiently small crystals in a sufficiently large sample, every orientation is represented, leading to an approximately isotropic material. In effect, this allows a polycrystal to display properties of a higher symmetry than the individual crystals composing it. For example, an ideal polycrystal or pyroelectric crystallites will display electric dipoles in every direction, which cancel out, giving the polycrystal a net zero polarization.

An extension of the crystallographic point groups known as the Curie groups allows us to describe the symmetry of the polycrystal by the symmetry of the orientations of each crystallite. In an ideal polycrystal, every orientation is identical, which may be though of as having infinite rotational symmetry in all direction given by ∞∞, representing two perpendicular rotational axis. This gives two groups ∞∞ if the polycrystal has a net chirality, and ∞∞m if there is no net chirality. The remaining curie groups may be derived from the ideal symmetries using the Curie's principle. Curie's principle states that the symmetry of a (poly)crystal under a stimulus is the intersection of the symmetry of the stimulus and the symmetry of the (poly)crystal. Below is a table displaying the 7 curie groups along with mmm, and 222 resulting from an ideal polycrystal exposed to different stimuli in order to generate different symmetries.

Stimulus/texture	Ex Stimulus	Achiral	Chiral
None/Ideal Polycrystal	N/A	∞∞m	∞∞
Axial/Fiber Texture	Tensile strain (∞/mm)	∞/mm	∞2
Biaxial/Sheet Texture	Shear Strain (Rolling (mmm))	mmm	222
Vector/ (N/A)	Electric Field (∞m)	∞m	∞
Pseudo-Vector/ (N/A)	Magnetic Field (∞/m)	∞/m	

This extension of symmetry to polycrystals is of significant value to manufacturing, as it allows for generating polycrystal samples that can display low symmetry properties rather than needing pure single crystals. Additionally, it allows the properties to be oriented by the manufacturing process rather than careful orientation of the single crystal. For example, if a pyroelectric is needed, a polycrystal of a suitable material may be made and then exposed to a strong electric field to reorient the dipoles of each crystallite with that electric field. The resulting polycrystal then displays pyroelectricity along the direction the electric field was applied.

=== Magnetic Point Groups ===
Some material properties, such as magnetism, display an additional form of symmetry commonly called, anti-symmetry, magnetic symmetry, time-reversal symmetry, or dichromatic symmetry. This new symmetry flips a binary state, such as spin, and is attached to other symmetry elements. Regardless of the property under consideration, the binary state at a given point is typically represented by either a black or white point, hence the name 'dichromatic symmetry'.

Example:

A classical model for magnetism considers the spin of electrons as current loops generating a magnetic dipole, which can be represented as a pseudo-vector. If acted upon by a mirror plane perpendicular to the dipole, the current loop (spin) remains in its original state, leading to the same dipole. If acted upon by a mirror plane parallel to the dipole, the current loop (spin) flips, leading to the opposite dipole. For either of these cases, anti-symmetry may be added to the mirror plane. The spatial effect of the mirror is unchanged, but its influence on the binary state is flipped; ie, if the regular mirror flipped the spin, the anti-symmetric mirror does not.

By adding anti-symmetry to the crystallographic point groups, 122 magnetic groups are generated. Of these 122, 32 are the original crystallographic point groups and 32 are so called grey groups, in which the black and white state of the property overlap on the same points. The remaining 58 groups are capable of displaying dichroic properties such as magnetism.

== See also ==
- Molecular symmetry
- Point group
- Space group
- Point groups in three dimensions
- Crystal system
- Geometrical crystallography before X-rays
