= Achávalite =

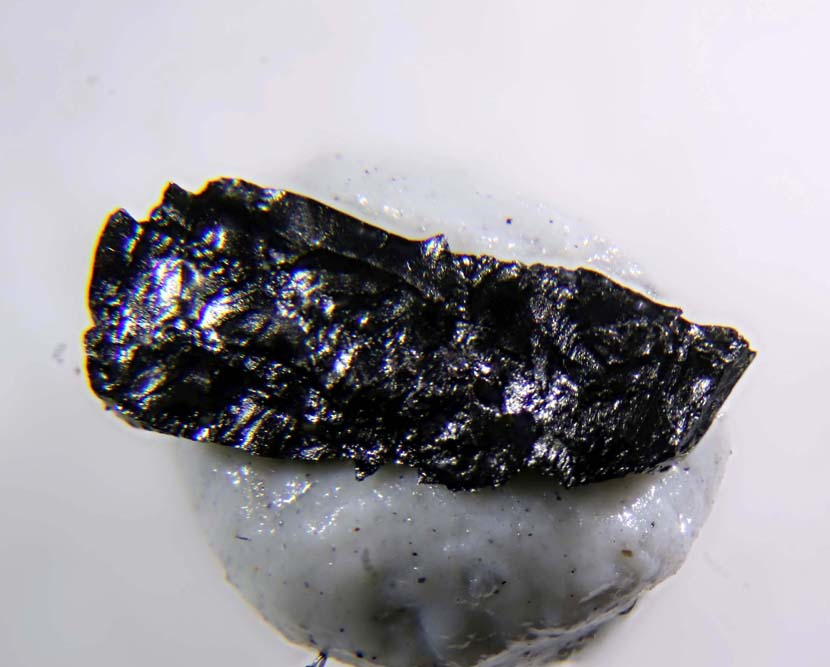
- Black metallic crystals of achávalite from Cacheuta Mine, Mendoza, Argentina

General
- Category: Selenide mineral
- Formula: (Fe,Cu)Se
- IMA symbol: Ahv
- Strunz classification: 2.CC.05
- Crystal system: Hexagonal
- Crystal class: Dihexagonal dipyramidal (6/mmm); H-M symbol: (6/m 2/m 2/m)
- Space group: P6_{3}/mmc
- Unit cell: a = 3.636, c = 5.946 [Å], Z = 2

Identification
- Formula mass: 134.81 g/mol
- Color: Dark grey
- Mohs scale hardness: 2.5
- Luster: Metallic
- Streak: Grey-black
- Diaphaneity: Opaque
- Specific gravity: 6.53

Achávalite is a selenide mineral that is a member of the nickeline group. It has only been found in a single Argentinian mine system, being first discovered in 1939 in a selenide deposit. The type locality is Cacheuta mine, Sierra de Cacheuta, Mendoza, Argentina.

== See also ==
- List of minerals
