= August Breithaupt =

German mineralogist

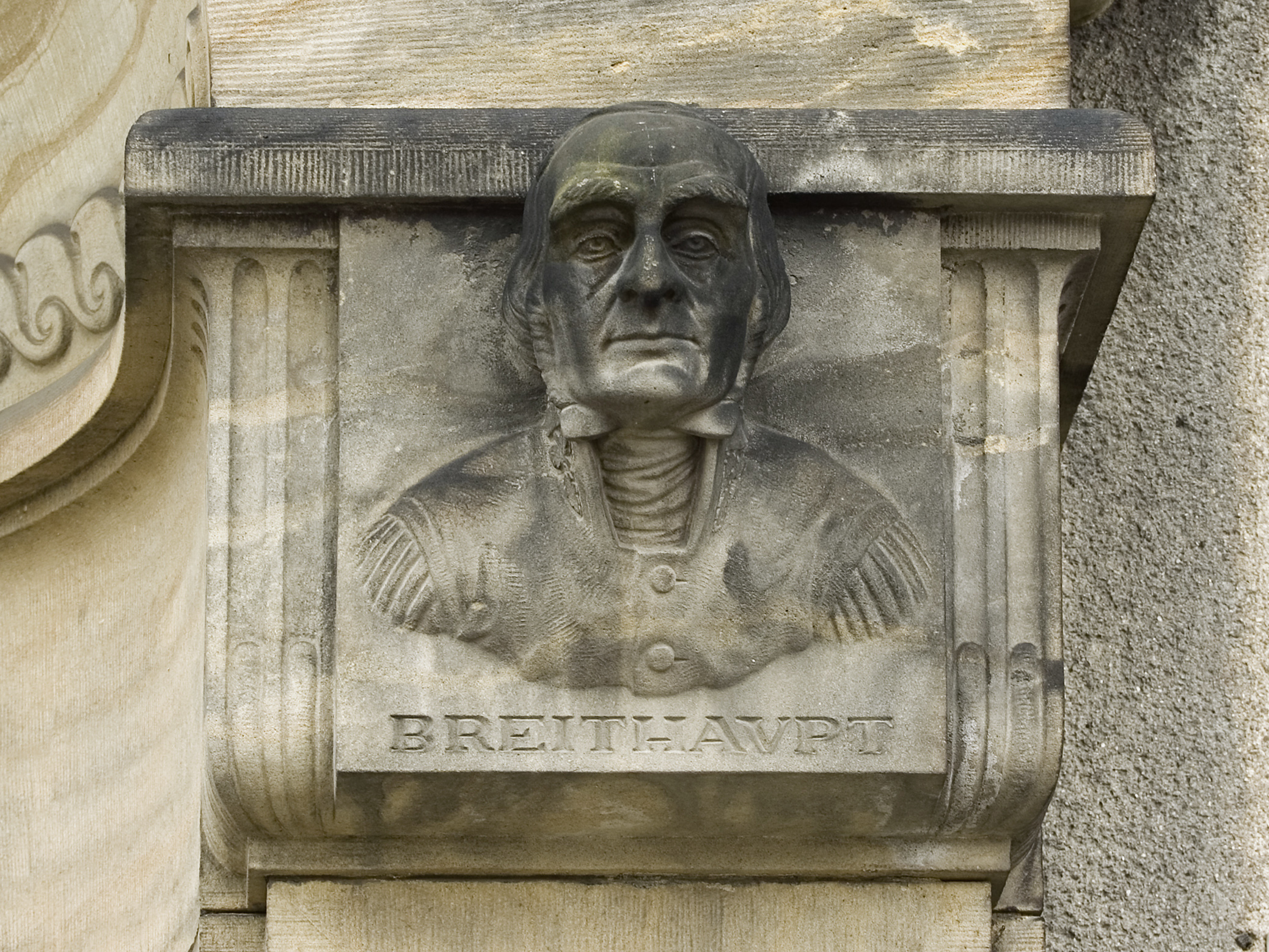
- Relief portrait on the Werner building in Freiberg
- Born: Johann Friedrich August Briethaupt; May 16, 1791; Probstzella, Holy Roman Empire (now Germany)
- Died: September 22, 1873 (aged 82)

Johann Friedrich August Breithaupt (May 16, 1791 – September 22, 1873) was a German mineralogist and professor at Freiberg Mining Academy in Freiberg, Saxony.

== Biography ==
He was born in Probstzella, Holy Roman Empire. He received his doctorate at the Universities of Jena and Marburg. He studied under Abraham Gottlob Werner at the Freiberg Mining Academy where he received an appointment in 1813 as teacher and lapidary, and became professor of mineralogy after the departure of Friedrich Mohs in 1826. He held that position until 1866.

== Research ==
He is credited with the discovery of 47 valid mineral species. The mineral breithauptite was named in his honor. His work included important contributions to crystallography and the physical and chemical properties of minerals. He developed the concept of mineral paragenesis.

== Works ==
His publications include:

- Ueber die Echtheit der Krystalle (1815, on pseudomorphs)
- Characteristik des Mineral Systems (1820; 3d improved ed., 1832)
- Vollständiges Handbuch der Mineralogie (1841)
- Die Bergstadt Freiberg (1825; 2d ed., 1847)
- Die Paragenesis der Mineralien (1849)
