= Triclinic crystal system =

One of the seven crystal systems

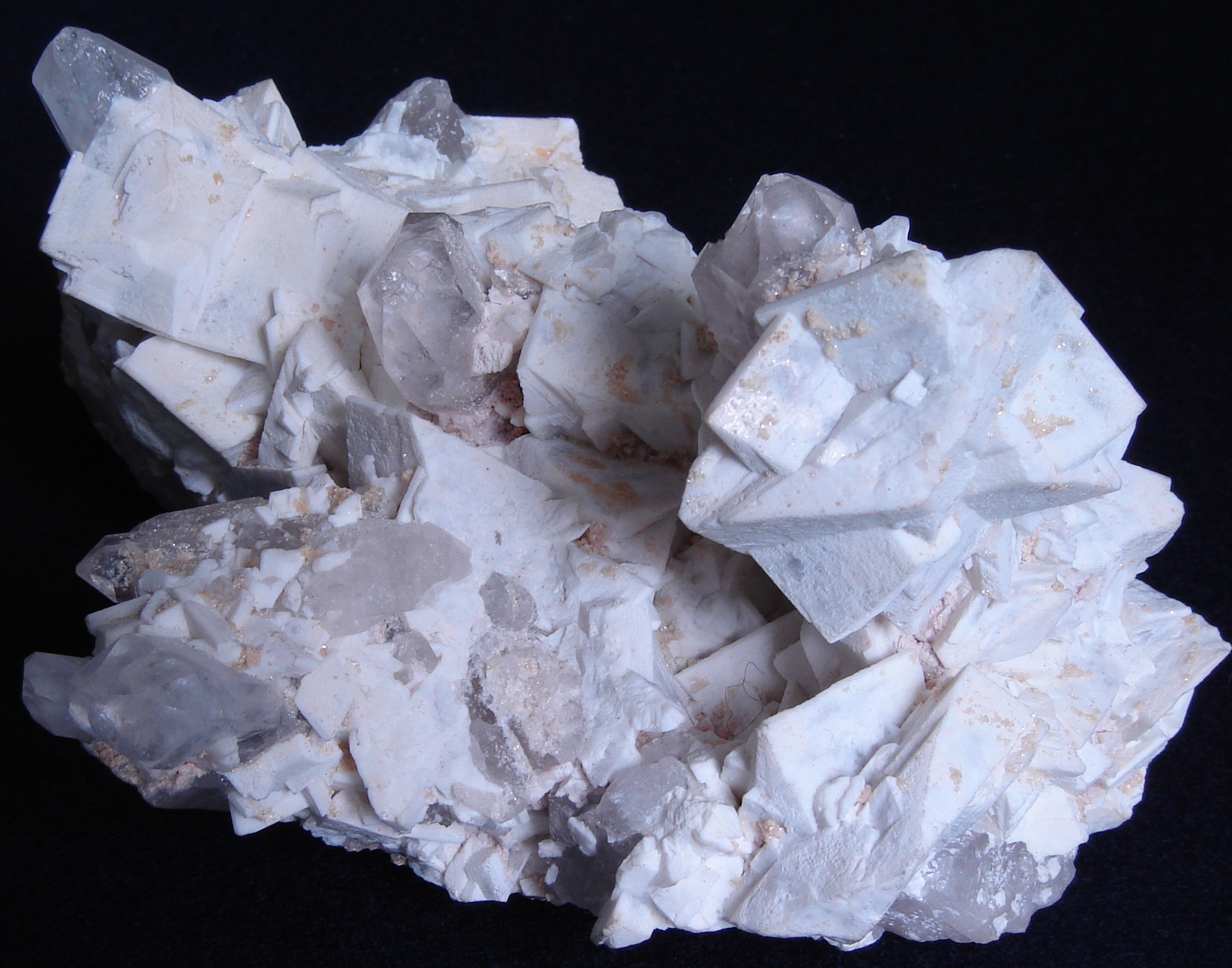
Microcline, an example of the triclinic crystal system

Triclinic (a ≠ b ≠ c ≠ a and α, β, γ, 90° pairwise different)

In crystallography, the triclinic (or anorthic) crystal system is the least symmetrical of the seven crystal systems. A crystal system is described by three basis vectors and the angles between them. In the triclinic system, the crystal is not required to have equal lattice vector lengths. Additionally, the angles between these vectors are not constrained to be equal, or include 90°.

The triclinic lattice is the least symmetric of the 14 three-dimensional Bravais lattices. It has (itself) the minimum symmetry all lattices have: points of inversion at each lattice point and at 7 more points for each lattice point: at the midpoints of the edges and the faces, and at the center points. It is the only lattice type that itself has no mirror planes.

== Crystal classes ==
The triclinic crystal system class names, examples, Schönflies notation, Hermann-Mauguin notation, point groups, International Tables for Crystallography space group number, orbifold, type, and space groups are listed in the table below. There are a total of 2 space groups.

#	Point group					Type	Example	Space group
#	Name	Schönflies	Intl	orbifold	Coxeter	Type	Example	Space group
1	Pedial	C_{1}	1	11	[ ]^{+}	enantiomorphic polar	Tantite	P1
2	Pinacoidal	C_{i} (S_{2})	1̅	1×	[2^{+},2^{+}]	centrosymmetric	Wollastonite	P1̅

With each only one space group is associated. Pinacoidal is also known as triclinic normal. Pedial is also triclinic hemihedral.

Mineral examples include plagioclase, microcline, rhodonite, turquoise, wollastonite and amblygonite, all in triclinic normal (1̅).

== See also ==
- Crystal structure
- Crystal system
