= Tetragonal crystal system =

Lattice point group

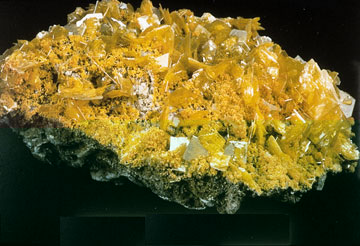
An example of tetragonal crystals, wulfenite

Two different views (top down and from the side) of the unit cell of tP30-CrFe (σ-phase Frank–Kasper structure) that show its different side lengths, making this structure a member of the tetragonal crystal system.

In crystallography, the tetragonal crystal system is one of the seven crystal systems. Tetragonal crystal lattices result from stretching a cubic lattice along one of its lattice vectors, so that the cube becomes a rectangular prism with a square base (a by a) and height (c, which is different from a).

== Bravais lattices ==
There are two tetragonal Bravais lattices: the primitive tetragonal and the body-centered tetragonal.

Bravais lattice	Primitive tetragonal	Body-centered tetragonal
Pearson symbol	tP	tI
Unit cell		

The face-centered tetragonal lattice is equivalent to the body-centered tetragonal lattice with a smaller unit cell, while the base-centered tetragonal lattice is equivalent to the primitive tetragonal lattice with a smaller unit cell.

== Crystal classes ==
The point groups that fall under this crystal system are listed below, followed by their representations in international notation, Schoenflies notation, orbifold notation, Coxeter notation and mineral examples.

#	Point group					Type	Example	Space groups	
#	Name	Intl	Schoen.	Orb.	Cox.	Type	Example	Primitive	Body-centered
75–80	Tetragonal pyramidal	4	C_{4}	44	[4]^{+}	enantiomorphic polar	pinnoite, piypite	P4, P4_{1}, P4_{2}, P4_{3}	I4, I4_{1}
81–82	Tetragonal disphenoidal	4̅	S_{4}	2×	[2^{+},4^{+}]		cahnite, tugtupite	P4̅	I4̅
83–88	Tetragonal dipyramidal	4/m	C_{4h}	4*	[2,4^{+}]	centrosymmetric	scheelite, wulfenite, leucite	P4/m, P4_{2}/m, P4/n, P4_{2}/n	I4/m, I4_{1}/a
89–98	Tetragonal trapezohedral	422	D_{4}	224	[2,4]^{+}	enantiomorphic	cristobalite, wardite	P422, P42_{1}2, P4_{1}22, P4_{1}2_{1}2, P4_{2}22, P4_{2}2_{1}2, P4_{3}22, P4_{3}2_{1}2	I422, I4_{1}22
99–110	Ditetragonal pyramidal	4mm	C_{4v}	*44	[4]	polar	diaboleite	P4mm, P4bm, P4_{2}cm, P4_{2}nm, P4cc, P4nc, P4_{2}mc, P4_{2}bc	I4mm, I4cm, I4_{1}md, I4_{1}cd
111–122	Tetragonal scalenohedral	4̅2m	D_{2d} (V_{d})	2*2	[2^{+},4]		chalcopyrite, stannite	P4̅2m, P4̅2c, P4̅2_{1}m, P4̅2_{1}c, P4̅m2, P4̅c2, P4̅b2, P4̅n2	I4̅m2, I4̅c2, I4̅2m, I4̅2d
123–142	Ditetragonal dipyramidal	4/mmm (4/m 2/m 2/m)	D_{4h}	*224	[2,4]	centrosymmetric	rutile, pyrolusite, zircon	P4/mmm, P4/mcc, P4/nbm, P4/nnc, P4/mbm, P4/mnc, P4/nmm, P4/ncc, P4_{2}/mmc, P4_{2}/mcm, P4_{2}/nbc, P4_{2}/nnm, P4_{2}/mbc, P4_{2}/mnm, P4_{2}/nmc, P4_{2}/ncm	I4/mmm, I4/mcm, I4_{1}/amd, I4_{1}/acd

== In two dimensions ==
There is only one tetragonal Bravais lattice in two dimensions: the square lattice.

Bravais lattice	Square
Pearson symbol	tp
Unit cell	

== See also ==
- Bravais lattices
- Crystal system
- Crystal structure
- Point groups
