= Carbonyl selenide =

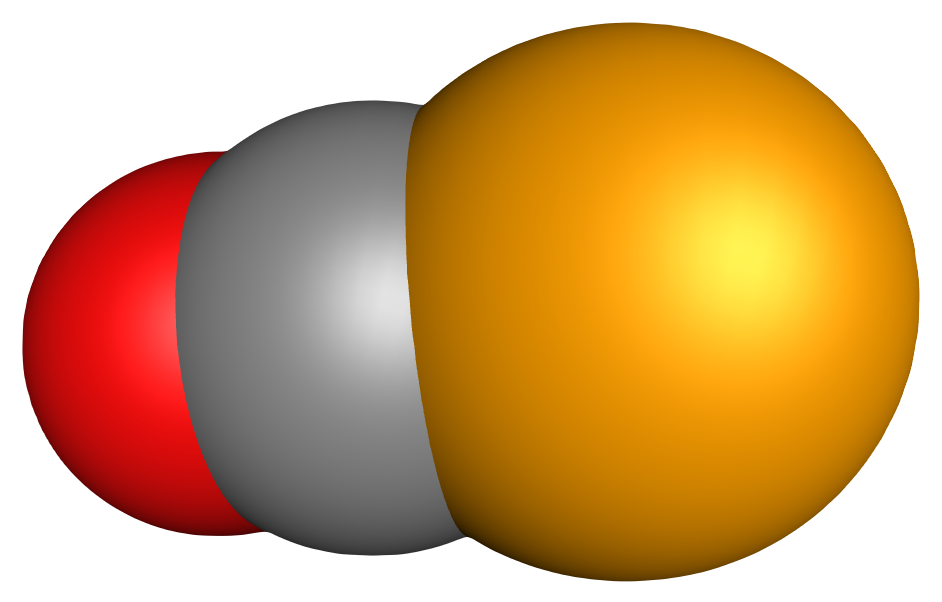

Names
- Preferred IUPAC name Selanylidenemethanone

Identifiers
CAS Number	1603-84-5
3D model (JSmol)	Interactive image
ChemSpider	120807
PubChem CID	137100
CompTox Dashboard (EPA)	DTXSID80166855
- InChI: InChI=1S/COSe/c2-1-3 Key: RQZJHKMUYSXABM-UHFFFAOYSA-N
- SMILES: [Se]=C=O

Properties
Chemical formula	COSe
Molar mass	106.981 g·mol^{−1}
Appearance	Colorless gas
Odor	Unpleasant
Boiling point	−22 °C (−8 °F; 251 K)
- Except where otherwise noted, data are given for materials in their standard state (at 25 °C [77 °F], 100 kPa). Infobox references

Carbonyl selenide is a chemical compound with the chemical formula O=C=Se. It is a linear molecule that is primarily of interest for research purposes.

== Properties ==
Carbonyl selenide is a colorless gas with an unpleasant odor. Although the compound is quite stable, its solutions gradually revert to elemental selenium and carbon monoxide.

== Synthesis and reactions ==
Carbonyl selenide can be produced by treating selenium with carbon monoxide in the presence of amines.

It is used in organoselenium chemistry as a means of incorporating selenium into organic compounds, e.g. for the preparation of selenocarbamates (O-selenocarbamates R−O−C(=Se)−NR'R" and Se-selenocarbamates, R−Se−C(=O)−NR'R", where R is organyl and R' and R" are any group, typically H or organyl).

Carbonyl selenide is believed to catalyze certain (oxidative and non-oxidative) carbonylation reactions.
