= Polar point group =

In geometry, a polar point group is a point group in which there is more than one point that every symmetry operation leaves unmoved. The unmoved points will constitute a line, a plane, or all of space.

While the simplest point group, C_{1}, leaves all points invariant, most polar point groups will move some, but not all points. To describe the points which are unmoved by the symmetry operations of the point group, we draw a straight line joining two unmoved points. This line is called a polar direction. The electric polarization must be parallel to a polar direction. In polar point groups of high symmetry, the polar direction can be a unique axis of rotation, but if the symmetry operations do not allow any rotation at all, such as mirror symmetry, there can be an infinite number of such axes: in that case the only restriction on the polar direction is that it must be parallel to any mirror planes.

A point group with more than one axis of rotation or with a mirror plane perpendicular to an axis of rotation cannot be polar.

== Polar crystallographic point group ==
Of the 32 crystallographic point groups, 10 are polar:

Polar crystallographic point groups
Crystal system	Polar point groups							
Crystal system	Schönflies		Hermann–Mauguin		Orbifold		Coxeter	
Triclinic	C_{1}		1		11		[ ]^{+}	
Monoclinic	C_{2}	C_{s}	2	m	22	*	[2]^{+}	[ ]
Orthorhombic	C_{2v}		mm2			*22		[2]
Trigonal	C_{3}	C_{3v}	3	3m	33	*33	[3]^{+}	[3]
Tetragonal	C_{4}	C_{4v}	4	4mm	44	*44	[4]^{+}	[4]
Hexagonal	C_{6}	C_{6v}	6	6mm	66	*66	[6]^{+}	[6]
Cubic	(none)							

The space groups associated with a polar point group do not have a discrete set of possible origin points that are unambiguously determined by symmetry elements.

When materials having a polar point group crystal structure are heated or cooled, they may temporarily generate a voltage called pyroelectricity.

Molecular crystals which have symmetry described by one of the polar space groups, such as sucrose, may exhibit triboluminescence.
