= Cobalt(II) selenide =

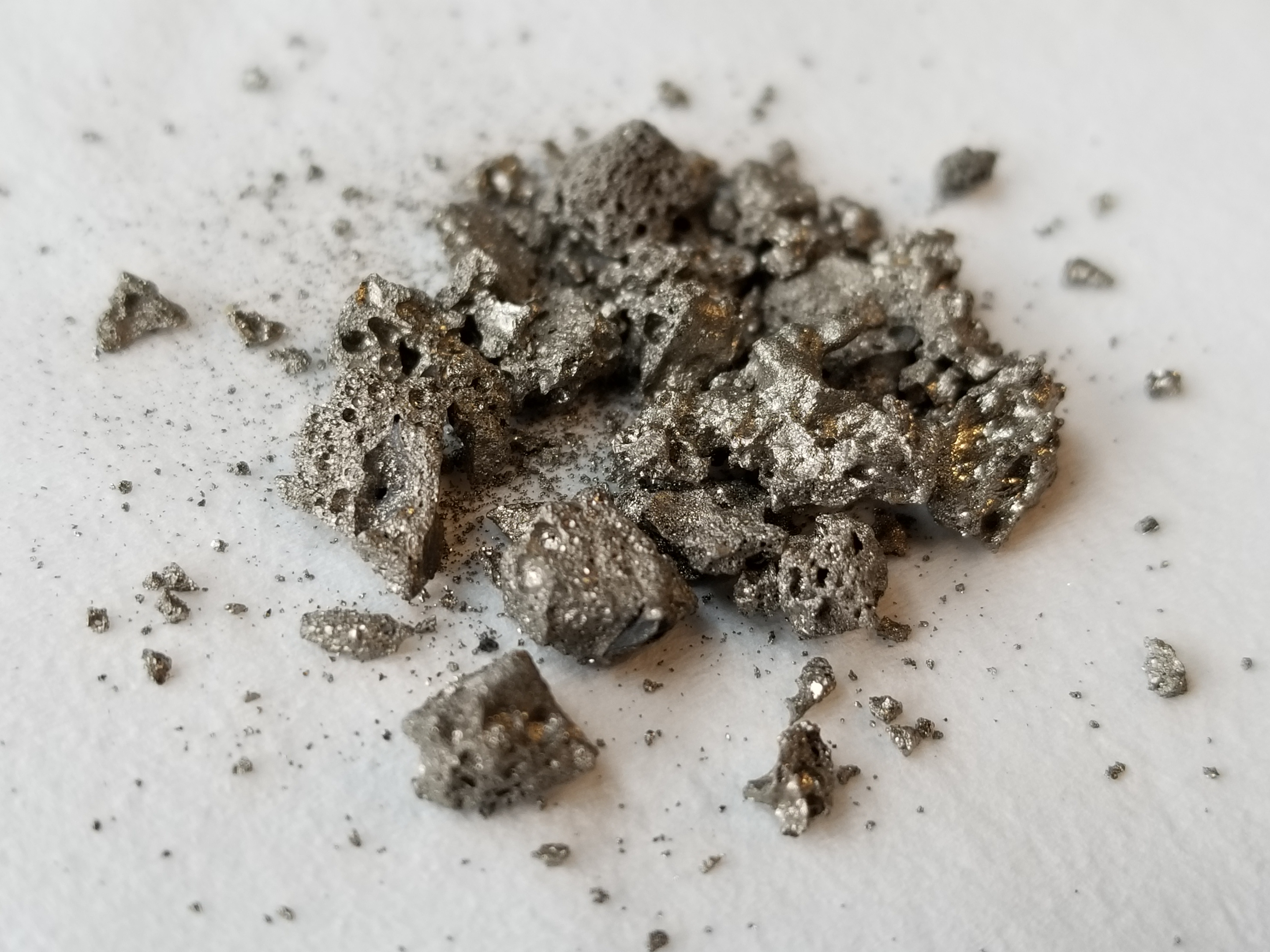

Names
- IUPAC name Cobalt(II) selenide

Identifiers
CAS Number	1307-99-9
3D model (JSmol)	Interactive image
ECHA InfoCard	100.013.778
EC Number	215-155-1
PubChem CID	102108
CompTox Dashboard (EPA)	DTXSID6061652
- InChI: InChI=1S/Co.Se Key: QVYIMIJFGKEJDW-UHFFFAOYSA-N
- SMILES: [Co]=[Se]

Properties
Chemical formula	CoSe
Molar mass	137.89 g/mol
Density	7.65 g/cm^{3}
Melting point	1,055 °C (1,931 °F; 1,328 K)
Solubility in water	Insoluble

Structure
Crystal structure	Hexagonal (NiAs), hP4
Space group	P6_{3}/mmc, No. 194
Lattice constant	a = 0.362 nm, b = 0.362 nm, c = 0.52 nm α = 90°, β = 90°, γ = 120°
Formula units (Z)	2

Hazards
- GHS labelling
Pictograms	(GHS06: Toxic) (GHS08: Health hazard) (GHS09: Environmental hazard)
Signal word	Danger
Hazard statements	H301, H331, H373, H410
Precautionary statements	P260, P264, P270, P271, P273, P301+P316, P304+P340, P316, P319, P321, P330, P391, P403+P233, P405, P501
- Except where otherwise noted, data are given for materials in their standard state (at 25 °C [77 °F], 100 kPa). Infobox references

Cobalt(II) selenide is an inorganic compound with the chemical formula CoSe. The mineral form of this compound is known as freboldite. Similar minerals include trogtalite (CoSe_{2}) and bornhardtite (Co^{2+}Co^{3+}_{2}Se_{4}).

== Preparation ==
Cobalt(II) selenide can be prepared by placing cobalt selenite in 10% sodium hydroxide solution, stirring it, and adding it drop by drop into the 10% sodium hydroxide solution of sodium thiosulfate. When the color of the reaction solution no longer changes, let it stand, filter, and use water and wash it with 5% hydrochloric acid and dry it to obtain CoSe.

Cobalt(II) selenide can also be produced by the electrodeposition reaction of cobalt(II) acetate and sodium selenite in acidic solution. When the pH is 3.5, the ratio of cobalt and selenium in the compound is closest to 1:1; too low a pH will make the compound rich in selenium, while higher The pH will be rich in cobalt.

== Applications ==
Ag^{+}-doped cobalt(II) selenide nanoparticles can be used as catalysts for water electrolysis. Cobalt(II) selenide materials mixed with tin selenide can be used as electrodes in dye-sensitized solar cells.

== Related compounds ==
Cobalt(II) selenide can exist in the form of non-stoichiometric compounds. Dissolve cobalt(II) chloride and urea in deionized water in a stoichiometric ratio of 1:1, heat to 120 °C in a stainless steel reactor to obtain pink precipitate Co(CO_{3})_{0.35}Cl_{0.20}(OH)_{1.10}, wash and vacuum dry. In addition, add selenium powder to the sodium borohydride aqueous solution and shake until the black solid disappears to obtain a NaHSe solution. Add the cobalt source and selenium source into the reaction kettle to perform solvothermal (ethanol-water) reaction to obtain Co_{0.85}Se. This compound is ferromagnetic at room temperature.

In addition, Co_{9}Se_{8}, Co_{2}Se_{3}, Co_{3}Se_{4} and CoSe_{2} have also been reported.
