= Orthorhombic crystal system =

Type of three-dimensional crystal structural geometry

In crystallography, the orthorhombic crystal system is one of the seven crystal systems. Orthorhombic lattices result from stretching a cubic lattice along two of its orthogonal pairs by two different factors, resulting in a rectangular prism with a rectangular base (a by b) and height (c), such that a, b, and c are distinct. All three bases intersect at 90° angles, so the three lattice vectors remain mutually orthogonal.

== Bravais lattices ==
There are four orthorhombic Bravais lattices: primitive orthorhombic, base-centered orthorhombic, body-centered orthorhombic, and face-centered orthorhombic.

Bravais lattice	Primitive orthorhombic	Base-centered orthorhombic	Body-centered orthorhombic	Face-centered orthorhombic
Pearson symbol	oP	oS	oI	oF
Unit cell	Orthohombic, simple	Orthohombic, base-centered	Orthohombic, body-centered	Orthohombic, face-centered

The primitive cell of the base-centered orthorhombic lattice has the shape of a right rhombic prism; it can be constructed because the two-dimensional centered rectangular base layer can also be described with primitive rhombic axes. Note that the length $a$ of the primitive cell below equals $\frac{1}{2} \sqrt{a^2+b^2}$ of the conventional cell above.

Right rhombic prism primitive cell

Primitive cell of the base-centered orthorhombic lattice

Relationship between base layers of primitive and conventional cells

== Crystal classes ==
The orthorhombic crystal system class names, examples, Schönflies notation, Hermann-Mauguin notation, point groups, International Tables for Crystallography space group number, orbifold notation, type, and space groups are listed in the table below.

№	Point group					Type	Example	Space groups			
№	Name	Schön.	Intl	Orb.	Cox.	Type	Example	Primitive	Base-centered	Face-centered	Body-centered
16–24	Rhombic disphenoidal	D_{2} (V)	222	222	[2,2]^{+}	Enantiomorphic	Epsomite Boron (gamma form)	P222, P222_{1}, P2_{1}2_{1}2, P2_{1}2_{1}2_{1}	C222_{1}, C222	F222	I222, I2_{1}2_{1}2_{1}
25–46	Rhombic pyramidal	C_{2v}	mm2	*22	[2]	Polar	Hemimorphite, bertrandite	Pmm2, Pmc2_{1}, Pcc2, Pma2, Pca2_{1}, Pnc2, Pmn2_{1}, Pba2, Pna2_{1}, Pnn2	Cmm2, Cmc2_{1}, Ccc2; Amm2, Aem2, Ama2, Aea2	Fmm2, Fdd2	Imm2, Iba2, Ima2
47–74	Rhombic dipyramidal	D_{2h} (V_{h})	mmm (2/m 2/m 2/m)	*222	[2,2]	Centrosymmetric	Olivine, aragonite, marcasite	Pmmm, Pnnn, Pccm, Pban, Pmma, Pnna, Pmna, Pcca, Pbam, Pccn, Pbcm, Pnnm, Pmmn, Pbcn, Pbca, Pnma	Cmcm, Cmce, Cmmm, Cccm, Cmme, Ccce	Fmmm, Fddd	Immm, Ibam, Ibca, Imma

== In two dimensions ==
In two dimensions there are two orthorhombic Bravais lattices: primitive rectangular and centered rectangular.

Bravais lattice	Rectangular	Centered rectangular
Pearson symbol	op	oc
Unit cell		

== See also ==
- Crystal structure
- Crystal system
- Overview of all space groups

== Sources ==
- Hahn, Theo, ed. (2002). International Tables for Crystallography, Volume A: Space Group Symmetry. International Tables for Crystallography. Vol. A (5th ed.). Berlin, New York: Springer-Verlag. doi:10.1107/97809553602060000100. ISBN 978-0-7923-6590-7.
