= Centrosymmetry =

Type of symmetry

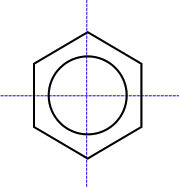
Benzene is a centrosymmetric molecule having a center of symmetry at the center

In crystallography, a centrosymmetric point group contains an inversion center as one of its symmetry elements. In such a point group, for every point (x, y, z) in the unit cell there is an indistinguishable point (-x, -y, -z). Such point groups are also said to have inversion symmetry. Point reflection is a similar term used in geometry. Crystals with an inversion center cannot display certain properties, such as the piezoelectric effect and the frequency doubling effect (second-harmonic generation). In addition, in such crystals, one-photon absorption (OPA) and two-photon absorption (TPA) processes are mutually exclusive, i.e., they do not occur simultaneously, and provide complementary information.

The following space groups have inversion symmetry: the triclinic space group 2, the monoclinic 10–15, the orthorhombic 47–74, the tetragonal 83-88 and 123–142, the trigonal 147, 148 and 162–167, the hexagonal 175, 176 and 191–194, the cubic 200-206 and 221–230.

Point groups lacking an inversion center (non-centrosymmetric) can be polar, chiral, both, or neither.

A polar point group is one whose symmetry operations leave more than one common point unmoved. A polar point group has no unique origin because each of those unmoved points can be chosen as one. One or more unique polar axes could be made through two such collinear unmoved points. Polar crystallographic point groups include 1, 2, 3, 4, 6, m, mm2, 3m, 4mm, and 6mm.

A chiral (often also called enantiomorphic) point group is one containing only proper (often called "pure") rotation symmetry. No inversion, reflection, roto-inversion or roto-reflection (i.e., improper rotation) symmetry exists in such point group. Chiral crystallographic point groups include 1, 2, 3, 4, 6, 222, 422, 622, 32, 23, and 432. Chiral molecules such as proteins crystallize in chiral point groups.

The remaining non-centrosymmetric crystallographic point groups 4̅, 4̅2m, 6̅, 6̅m2, 4̅3m are neither polar nor chiral.

== See also ==
- Centrosymmetric matrix
- Rule of mutual exclusion
