= 33344-33434 tiling =

Uniform tiling of the plane using regular polygons

33344-33434 tilings
Faced colored by their symmetry positions
Type	2-uniform tiling	
Designation	[3^{3}.4^{2}; 3^{2}.4.3.4]_{1}	[3^{3}.4^{2}; 3^{2}.4.3.4]_{2}
Vertex configurations	3.3.4.3.4 and 3.3.3.4.4	
Symmetry	p4g, [4,4^{+}], (4*2)	pgg, [4^{+},4^{+}], (22×)
Rotation symmetry	p4, [4,4]^{+}, (442)	p2, [4^{+},4^{+}]^{+}, (2222)
Properties	4-isohedral, 5-isotoxal	3-isohedral, 6-isotoxal

In geometry of the Euclidean plane, a 33344-33434 tiling is one of two of 20 2-uniform tilings of the Euclidean plane by regular polygons. They contains regular triangle and square faces, arranged in two vertex configuration: 3.3.3.4.4 and 3.3.4.3.4.

The first has triangles in groups of 3 and square in groups of 1 and 2. It has 4 types of faces and 5 types of edges.

The second has triangles in groups of 4, and squares in groups of 2. It has 3 types of face and 6 types of edges.

== Geometry ==
Its two vertex configurations are shared with two 1-uniform tilings:

3.3.4.3.4	3.3.3.4.4
snub square tiling	elongated triangular tiling

== Circle Packings ==
These 2-uniform tilings can be used as a circle packings.

In the first 2-uniform tiling (whose dual resembles a key-lock pattern): cyan circles are in contact with 5 other circles (3 cyan, 2 pink), corresponding to the V3^{3}.4^{2} planigon, and pink circles are also in contact with 5 other circles (4 cyan, 1 pink), corresponding to the V3^{2}.4.3.4 planigon. It is homeomorphic to the ambo operation on the tiling, with the cyan and pink gap polygons corresponding to the cyan and pink circles (mini-vertex configuration polygons; one dimensional duals to the respective planigons). Both images coincide.

In the second 2-uniform tiling (whose dual resembles jagged streams of water): cyan circles are in contact with 5 other circles (2 cyan, 3 pink), corresponding to the V3^{3}.4^{2} planigon, and pink circles are also in contact with 5 other circles (3 cyan, 2 pink), corresponding to the V3^{2}.4.3.4 planigon. It is homeomorphic to the ambo operation on the tiling, with the cyan and pink gap polygons corresponding to the cyan and pink circles (mini-vertex configuration polygons; one dimensional duals to the respective planigons). Both images coincide.

Circle Packings of and Ambo Operations on Two Pentagonal Isoperimetric 2-dual-uniform tilings.
C[3^{3}.4^{2}; 3^{2}.4.3.4]_{1}	a3^{3}.4^{2}; 3^{2}.4.3.4]_{1}	C[3^{3}.4^{2}; 3^{2}.4.3.4]_{2}	a[3^{3}.4^{2}; 3^{2}.4.3.4]_{2}

=== Dual tilings ===
The dual tilings have right triangle and kite faces, defined by face configurations: V3.3.3.4.4 and V3.3.4.3.4, and can be seen combining the prismatic pentagonal tiling and Cairo pentagonal tilings.

Faces	1-uniform		2-uniform	
Faces	V3.3.3.4.4	V3.3.4.3.4	V3.3.3.4.4 and V3.3.4.3.4	
V3.3.3.4.4 V3.3.4.3.4	prismatic pentagonal tiling	Cairo pentagonal tiling	Dual tiling I	Dual tiling II
