= Demiregular tiling =

Euclidean tilings using 2 or more regular polygon faces

In geometry, the demiregular tilings are a set of Euclidean tessellations made from 2 or more regular polygon faces. Different authors have listed different sets of tilings. A more systematic approach looking at symmetry orbits are the 2-uniform tilings of which there are 20. Some of the demiregular ones are actually 3-uniform tilings.

== 20 2-uniform tilings ==
Grünbaum and Shephard enumerated the full list of 20 2-uniform tilings in Tilings and patterns, 1987:

2-uniform tilings
cmm, 2*22 (4^{4}; 3^{3}.4^{2})_{1}	cmm, 2*22 (4^{4}; 3^{3}.4^{2})_{2}	pmm, *2222 (3^{6}; 3^{3}.4^{2})_{1}	cmm, 2*22 (3^{6}; 3^{3}.4^{2})_{2}	cmm, 2*22 (3.4^{2}.6; (3.6)^{2})_{2}	pmm, *2222 (3.4^{2}.6; (3.6)^{2})_{1}	pmm, *2222 ((3.6)^{2}; 3^{2}.6^{2})
p4m, *442 (3.12.12; 3.4.3.12)	p4g, 4*2 (3^{3}.4^{2}; 3^{2}.4.3.4)_{1}	pgg, 2× (3^{3}.4^{2}; 3^{2}.4.3.4)_{2}	p6m, *632 (3^{6}; 3^{2}.6^{2})	p6m, *632 (3^{6}; 3^{4}.6)_{1}	p6, 632 (3^{6}; 3^{4}.6)_{2}	cmm, 2*22 (3^{2}.6^{2}; 3^{4}.6)
p6m, *632 (3^{6}; 3^{2}.4.3.4)	p6m, *632 (3.4.6.4; 3^{2}.4.3.4)	p6m, *632 (3.4.6.4; 3^{3}.4^{2})	p6m, *632 (3.4.6.4; 3.4^{2}.6)	p6m, *632 (4.6.12; 3.4.6.4)	p6m, *632 (3^{6}; 3^{2}.4.12)	

== Ghyka's list (1946) ==
Ghyka lists 10 of them with 2 or 3 vertex types, calling them semiregular polymorph partitions.

Plate XXVII; No. 12; 4.6.12; 3.4.6.4	No. 13; 3.4.6.4; 3.3.3.4.4	No. 13 bis. 3.4.4.6; 3.3.4.3.4	No. 13 ter. 3.4.4.6; 3.3.3.4.4	Plate XXIV; No. 13 quatuor. 3.4.6.4; 3.3.4.3.4
No. 14; 3^{3}.4^{2} 3^{6}	Plate XXVI; No. 14 bis. 3.3.4.3.4; 3.3.3.4.4; 3^{6}	No. 14 ter. 3^{3}.4^{2} 3^{6}	No. 15; 3.3.4.12; 3^{6}	Plate XXV; No. 16; 3.3.4.12; 3.3.4.3.4; 3^{6}

== Steinhaus's list (1969) ==
Steinhaus gives 5 examples of non-homogeneous tessellations of regular polygons beyond the 11 regular and semiregular ones. (All of them have 2 types of vertices, while one is 3-uniform.)

2-uniform				3-uniform
Image 85; 3^{3}.4^{2} 3.4.6.4	Image 86; 3^{2}.4.3.4; 3.4.6.4	Image 87; 3.3.4.12; 3^{6}	Image 89; 3^{3}.4^{2} 3^{2}.4.3.4	Image 88; 3.12.12; 3.3.4.12

== Critchlow's list (1970) ==
Critchlow identifies 14 demi-regular tessellations, with 7 being 2-uniform, and 7 being 3-uniform.

He codes letter names for the vertex types, with superscripts to distinguish face orders. He recognizes A, B, C, D, F, and J can't be a part of continuous coverings of the whole plane.

A (none)	B (none)	C (none)	D (none)	E (semi)	F (none)	G (semi)	H (semi)	J (none)	K (2) (reg)	
3.7.42	3.8.24	3.9.18	3.10.15	3.12.12	4.5.20	4.6.12	4.8.8	5.5.10	6^{3}	
L1 (demi)	L2 (demi)	M1 (demi)	M2 (semi)	N1 (demi)	N2 (semi)	P (3) (reg)	Q1 (semi)	Q2 (semi)	R (semi)	S (1) (reg)
3.3.4.12	3.4.3.12	3.3.6.6	3.6.3.6	3.4.4.6	3.4.6.4	4^{4}	3.3.4.3.4	3.3.3.4.4	3.3.3.3.6	3^{6}

2-uniforms
1	2	4	6	7	10	14
(3.12.12; 3.4.3.12)	(3^{6}; 3^{2}.4.12)	(4.6.12; 3.4.6.4)	((3.6)^{2}; 3^{2}.6^{2})	(3.4.6.4; 3^{2}.4.3.4)	(3^{6}; 3^{2}.4.3.4)	(3.4.6.4; 3.4^{2}.6)
E+L2	L1+(1)	N1+G	M1+M2	N2+Q1	Q1+(1)	N1+Q2

3-uniforms
3	5	8	9	11	12	13
(3.3.4.3.4; 3.3.4.12, 3.4.3.12)	(3^{6}; 3.3.4.12; 3.3.4.3.4)	(3.3.4.3.4; 3.3.3.4.4, 4.3.4.6)	(3^{6}, 3.3.4.3.4)	(3^{6}; 3.3.4.3.4, 3.3.3.4.4)	(3^{6}; 3.3.4.3.4; 3.3.3.4.4)	(3.4.6.4; 3.4^{2}.6)
L1+L2+Q1	L1+Q1+(1)	N1+Q1+Q2	Q1+(1)	Q1+Q2+(1)	Q1+Q2+(1)	N1+N2
Claimed Tilings and Duals
