= 3-4-6-12 tiling =

Uniform Tiling

3-4-6-12 tiling
Type	2-uniform tiling
Vertex configuration	3.4.6.4 and 4.6.12
Symmetry	p6m, [6,3], (*632)
Rotation symmetry	p6, [6,3]^{+}, (632)
Properties	2-uniform, 4-isohedral, 4-isotoxal

In geometry of the Euclidean plane, the 3-4-6-12 tiling is one of 20 2-uniform tilings of the Euclidean plane by regular polygons, containing regular triangles, squares, hexagons and dodecagons, arranged in two vertex configuration: 3.4.6.4 and 4.6.12.

It has hexagonal symmetry, p6m, [6,3], (*632). It is also called a demiregular tiling by some authors.

== Geometry ==
Its two vertex configurations are shared with two 1-uniform tilings:

rhombitrihexagonal tiling	truncated trihexagonal tiling
3.4.6.4	4.6.12

It can be seen as a type of diminished rhombitrihexagonal tiling, with dodecagons replacing periodic sets of hexagons and surrounding squares and triangles. This is similar to the Johnson solid, a diminished rhombicosidodecahedron, which is a rhombicosidodecahedron with faces removed, leading to new decagonal faces. The dual of this variant is shown to the right (deltoidal hexagonal insets).

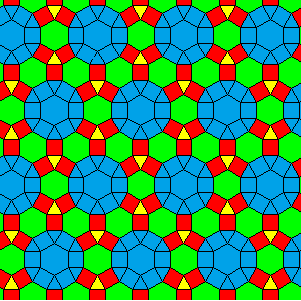
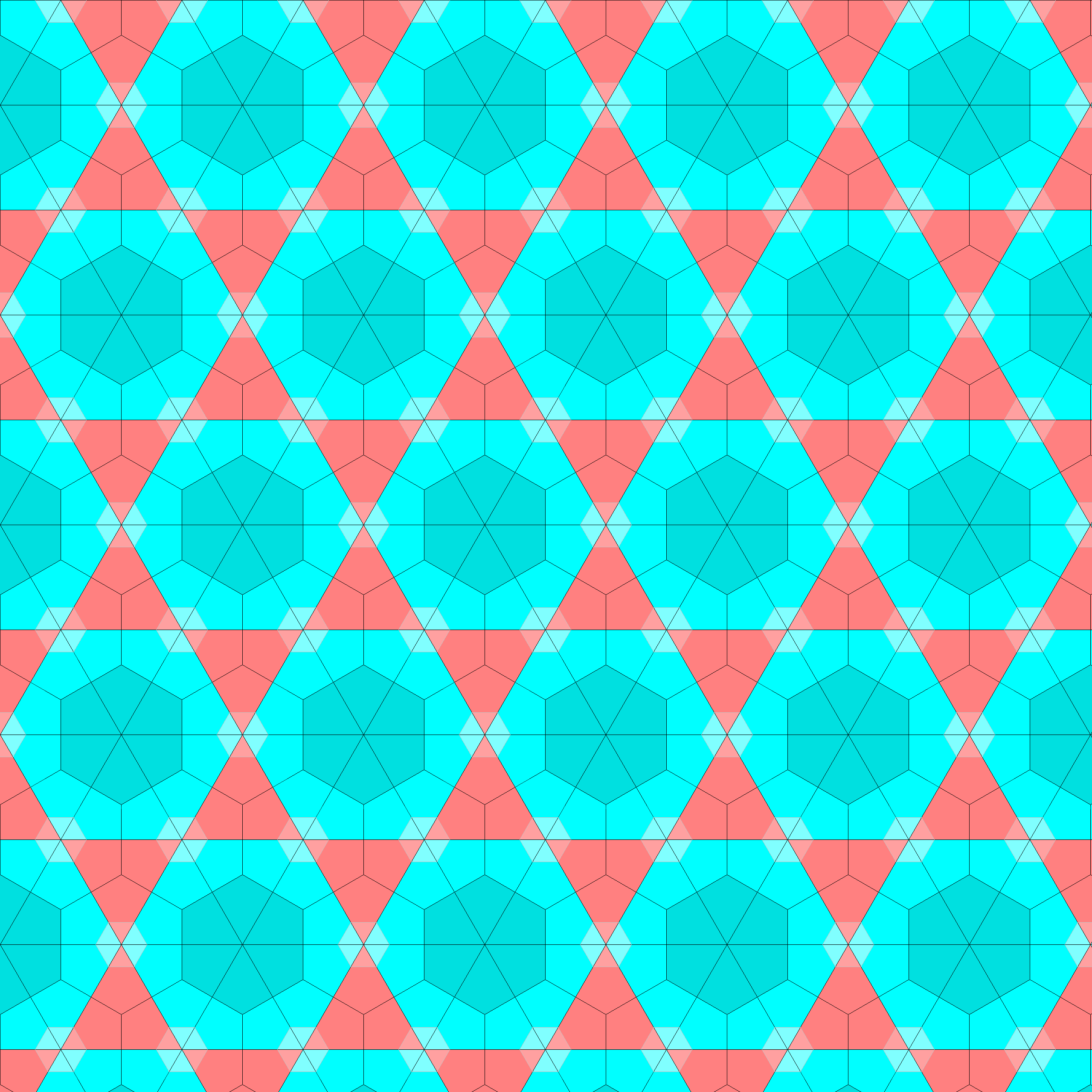

== Related k-uniform tilings of regular polygons ==
The hexagons can be dissected into 6 triangles, and the dodecagons can be dissected into triangles, hexagons and squares.

Dissected polygons
Hexagon	Dodecagon (each has 2 orientations)
Dual Processes (Dual 'Insets')

3-uniform tilings
48	26	18 (2-uniform)
[3^{6}; 3^{2}.4.3.4; 3^{2}.4.12]	[3.4^{2}.6; (3.4.6.4)^{2}]	[3^{6}; 3^{2}.4.3.4]
V[3^{6}; 3^{2}.4.3.4; 3^{2}.4.12]	V[3.4^{2}.6; (3.4.6.4)^{2}]	V[3^{6}; 3^{2}.4.3.4]
3-uniform duals

== Circle Packing ==
This 2-uniform tiling can be used as a circle packing. Cyan circles are in contact with 3 other circles (2 cyan, 1 pink), corresponding to the V4.6.12 planigon, and pink circles are in contact with 4 other circles (1 cyan, 2 pink), corresponding to the V3.4.6.4 planigon. It is homeomorphic to the ambo operation on the tiling, with the cyan and pink gap polygons corresponding to the cyan and pink circles (mini-vertex configuration polygons; one dimensional duals to the respective planigons). Both images coincide.

C[3.4.6.12]	a[3.4.6.12]

=== Dual tiling ===
The dual tiling has right triangle and kite faces, defined by face configurations: V3.4.6.4 and V4.6.12, and can be seen combining the deltoidal trihexagonal tiling and kisrhombille tilings.

Dual tiling	V3.4.6.4 V4.6.12	Deltoidal trihexagonal tiling	Kisrhombille tiling
