= List of k-uniform tilings =

Example k-uniform tilings
1-uniform (regular)	1-uniform (semiregular)
2-uniform tiling	3-uniform tiling

A k-uniform tiling is a tiling of tilings of the plane by convex regular polygons, connected edge-to-edge, with k types of vertices. The 1-uniform tiling include 3 regular tilings, and 8 semiregular tilings. A 1-uniform tiling can be defined by its vertex configuration. Higher k-uniform tilings are listed by their vertex figures, but are not generally uniquely identified this way.

The complete lists of k-uniform tilings have been enumerated up to k=6. There are 20 2-uniform tilings, 61 3-uniform tilings, 151 4-uniform tilings, 332 5-uniform tilings, and 673 6-uniform tilings. This article lists all solutions up to k=5.

This square tiling is isogonal and isohedral, but not uniform because it is not edge-to-edge.

Other tilings of regular polygons that are not edge-to-edge allow different sized polygons, and continuous shifting positions of contact.

== Classification ==
3-uniform tiling #57 of 61 colored
by sides, yellow triangles, red squares (by polygons)	by 4-isohedral positions, 3 shaded colors of triangles (by orbits)

Such periodic tilings of convex polygons may be classified by the number of orbits of vertices, edges and tiles. If there are k orbits of vertices, a tiling is known as k-uniform or k-isogonal; if there are t orbits of tiles, as t-isohedral; if there are e orbits of edges, as e-isotoxal.

k-uniform tilings with the same vertex figures can be further identified by their wallpaper group symmetry.

== Enumeration ==
1-uniform tilings include 3 regular tilings, and 8 semiregular ones, with 2 or more types of regular polygon faces. There are 20 2-uniform tilings, 61 3-uniform tilings, 151 4-uniform tilings, 332 5-uniform tilings and 673 6-uniform tilings. Each can be grouped by the number m of distinct vertex figures, which are also called m-Archimedean tilings.

Finally, if the number of types of vertices is the same as the uniformity (m = k below), then the tiling is said to be Krotenheerdt. In general, the uniformity is greater than or equal to the number of types of vertices (m ≥ k), as different types of vertices necessarily have different orbits, but not vice versa. Setting m = n = k, there are 11 such tilings for n = 1; 20 such tilings for n = 2; 39 such tilings for n = 3; 33 such tilings for n = 4; 15 such tilings for n = 5; 10 such tilings for n = 6; and 7 such tilings for n = 7.

k-uniform, m-Archimedean tiling counts
		m-Archimedean															
		1	2	3	4	5	6	7	8	9	10	11	12	13	14	≥ 15	Total
k-uniform	1	11	0														11
k-uniform	2	0	20	0													20
k-uniform	3	0	22	39	0												61
k-uniform	4	0	33	85	33	0											151
k-uniform	5	0	74	149	94	15	0										332
k-uniform	6	0	100	284	187	92	10	0									673
k-uniform	7	0	175	572	426	218	74	7	0								1472
k-uniform	8	0	258	1037	794	537	203	20	0	0							2850
k-uniform	9	0	424	1992	1608	1278	570	80	8	0	0						5960
k-uniform	10	0	663	3772	2979	2745	1468	212	27	0	0	0					11866
k-uniform	11	0	1086	7171	5798	5993	3711	647	52	1	0	0	0				24459
k-uniform	12	0	1607	13762	11006	12309	9230	1736	129	15	0	0	0	0			49794
k-uniform	13	0	2615	26662	21153	25380	22270	4721	243	37	1'	0	0	0	0		103082
k-uniform	14	0	?	?	?	?	?	?	?	?	?	?	?	?	0	0	?
k-uniform	≥ 15	0	?	?	?	?	?	?	?	?	?	?	?	?	?	0	?
k-uniform	Total	11	∞	∞	∞	∞	∞	∞	∞	∞	∞	∞	∞	∞	∞	0	∞

== 1-uniform tilings (regular) ==
A tiling is said to be regular if the symmetry group of the tiling acts transitively on the flags of the tiling, where a flag is a triple consisting of a mutually incident vertex, edge and tile of the tiling. This means that, for every pair of flags, there is a symmetry operation mapping the first flag to the second. This is equivalent to the tiling being an edge-to-edge tiling by congruent regular polygons. There must be six equilateral triangles, four squares or three regular hexagons at a vertex, yielding the three regular tessellations.

Regular tilings (3)
p6m, *632		p4m, *442
3^{6} (t=1, e=1)	6^{3} (t=1, e=1)	4^{4} (t=1, e=1)

== m-Archimedean and k-uniform tilings ==
Vertex-transitivity means that for every pair of vertices there is a symmetry operation mapping the first vertex to the second.

If the requirement of flag-transitivity is relaxed to one of vertex-transitivity, while the condition that the tiling is edge-to-edge is kept, there are eight additional tilings possible, known as Archimedean, uniform or demiregular tilings. Note that there are two mirror image (enantiomorphic or chiral) forms of 3^{4}.6 (snub hexagonal) tiling, only one of which is shown in the following table. All other regular and semiregular tilings are achiral.

Grünbaum and Shephard distinguish the description of these tilings as Archimedean as referring only to the local property of the arrangement of tiles around each vertex being the same, and that as uniform as referring to the global property of vertex-transitivity. Though these yield the same set of tilings in the plane, in other spaces there are Archimedean tilings which are not uniform.

=== 1-uniform tilings (semiregular) ===
Uniform tilings (8)
p6m, *632
[ 3.12^{2}] (t=2, e=2)	[ 3.4.6.4] (t=3, e=2)	[ 4.6.12] (t=3, e=3)	[ (3.6)^{2}] (t=2, e=1)
[ 4.8^{2}] (t=2, e=2)	[ 3^{2}.4.3.4] (t=2, e=2)	[ 3^{3}.4^{2}] (t=2, e=3)	[ 3^{4}.6] (t=3, e=3)

=== 2-uniform tilings ===
There are twenty (20) 2-uniform tilings of the Euclidean plane. (also called 2-isogonal tilings or demiregular tilings) Vertex types are listed for each. If two tilings share the same two vertex types, they are given subscripts 1,2.

2-uniform tilings (20)
p6m, *632						p4m, *442
[3^{6}; 3^{2}.4.3.4 (t=3, e=3)	[3.4.6.4; 3^{2}.4.3.4 (t=4, e=4)	[3.4.6.4; 3^{3}.4^{2}] (t=4, e=4)	[3.4.6.4; 3.4^{2}.6] (t=5, e=5)	[4.6.12; 3.4.6.4] (t=4, e=4)	[3^{6}; 3^{2}.4.12] (t=4, e=4)	[3.12.12; 3.4.3.12] (t=3, e=3)
p6m, *632	p6, 632	p6, 632	cmm, 2*22	pmm, *2222	cmm, 2*22	pmm, *2222
[3^{6}; 3^{2}.6^{2}] (t=2, e=3)	[3^{6}; 3^{4}.6]_{1} (t=3, e=3)	[3^{6}; 3^{4}.6]_{2} (t=5, e=7)	[3^{2}.6^{2}; 3^{4}.6] (t=2, e=4)	[3.6.3.6; 3^{2}.6^{2}] (t=2, e=3)	[3.4^{2}.6; 3.6.3.6]_{2} (t=3, e=4)	[3.4^{2}.6; 3.6.3.6]_{1} (t=4, e=4)
p4g, 4*2	pgg, 22×	cmm, 2*22	cmm, 2*22	pmm, *2222	cmm, 2*22	
[3^{3}.4^{2}; 3^{2}.4.3.4]_{1} (t=4, e=5)	[3^{3}.4^{2}; 3^{2}.4.3.4]_{2} (t=3, e=6)	[4^{4}; 3^{3}.4^{2}]_{1} (t=2, e=4)	[4^{4}; 3^{3}.4^{2}]_{2} (t=3, e=5)	[3^{6}; 3^{3}.4^{2}]_{1} (t=3, e=4)	[3^{6}; 3^{3}.4^{2}]_{2} (t=4, e=5)	

=== 3-uniform tilings ===
There are 61 3-uniform tilings of the Euclidean plane. 39 are 3-Archimedean with 3 distinct vertex types, while 22 have 2 identical vertex types in different symmetry orbits. Chavey (1989)

==== 3-uniform tilings, 3 vertex types ====
3-uniform tilings with 3 vertex types (39)
[3.4^{2}6; 3.6.3.6; 4.6.12] (t=6, e=7)	[3^{6}; 3^{2}4.12; 4.6.12] (t=5, e=6)	[3^{2}4.12; 3.4.6.4; 3.12^{2}] (t=5, e=6)	[3.4.3.12; 3.4.6.4; 3.12^{2}] (t=5, e=6)	[3^{3}4^{2}; 3^{2}4.12; 3.4.6.4] (t=6, e=8)
[3^{6}; 3^{3}4^{2}; 3^{2}4.12] (t=6, e=7)	[3^{6}; 3^{2}4.3.4; 3^{2}4.12] (t=5, e=6)	[3^{4}6; 3^{3}4^{2}; 3^{2}4.3.4] (t=5, e=6)	[3^{6}; 3^{2}4.3.4; 3.4^{2}6] (t=5, e=6)	[3^{6}; 3^{2}4.3.4; 3.4.6.4] (t=5, e=6)
[3^{6}; 3^{3}4^{2}; 3.4.6.4] (t=6, e=6)	[3^{6}; 3^{2}4.3.4; 3.4.6.4] (t=6, e=6)	[3^{6}; 3^{3}4^{2}; 3^{2}4.3.4] (t=4, e=5)	[3^{2}4.12; 3.4.3.12; 3.12^{2}] (t=4, e=7)	[3.4.6.4; 3.4^{2}6; 4^{4}] (t=3, e=4)
[3^{2}4.3.4; 3.4.6.4; 3.4^{2}6] (t=4, e=6)	[3^{3}4^{2}; 3^{2}4.3.4; 4^{4}] (t=4, e=6)	[3.4^{2}6; 3.6.3.6; 4^{4}] (t=5, e=7)	[3.4^{2}6; 3.6.3.6; 4^{4}] (t=6, e=7)	[3.4^{2}6; 3.6.3.6; 4^{4}] (t=4, e=5)
[3.4^{2}6; 3.6.3.6; 4^{4}] (t=4, e=6)	[3^{3}4^{2}; 3^{2}6^{2}; 3.4^{2}6] (t=5, e=8)	[3^{2}6^{2}; 3.4^{2}6; 3.6.3.6] (t=4, e=7)	[3^{2}6^{2}; 3.4^{2}6; 3.6.3.6] (t=5, e=7)	[3^{4}6; 3^{3}4^{2}; 3.4^{2}6] (t=5, e=7)
[3^{2}6^{2}; 3.6.3.6; 6^{3}] (t=4, e=5)	[3^{2}6^{2}; 3.6.3.6; 6^{3}] (t=2, e=4)	[3^{4}6; 3^{2}6^{2}; 6^{3}] (t=2, e=5)	[3^{6}; 3^{2}6^{2}; 6^{3}] (t=2, e=3)	[3^{6}; 3^{4}6; 3^{2}6^{2}] (t=5, e=8)
[3^{6}; 3^{4}6; 3^{2}6^{2}] (t=3, e=5)	[3^{6}; 3^{4}6; 3^{2}6^{2}] (t=3, e=6)	[3^{6}; 3^{4}6; 3.6.3.6] (t=5, e=6)	[3^{6}; 3^{4}6; 3.6.3.6] (t=4, e=4)	[3^{6}; 3^{4}6; 3.6.3.6] (t=3, e=3)
[3^{6}; 3^{3}4^{2}; 4^{4}] (t=4, e=6)	[3^{6}; 3^{3}4^{2}; 4^{4}] (t=5, e=7)	[3^{6}; 3^{3}4^{2}; 4^{4}] (t=3, e=5)	[3^{6}; 3^{3}4^{2}; 4^{4}] (t=4, e=6)	

==== 3-uniform tilings, 2 vertex types (2:1) ====
3-uniform tilings (2:1) (22)
[(3.4.6.4)2; 3.4^{2}6] (t=6, e=6)	[(3^{6})2; 3^{4}6] (t=3, e=4)	[(3^{6})2; 3^{4}6] (t=5, e=5)	[(3^{6})2; 3^{4}6] (t=7, e=9)	[3^{6}; (3^{4}6)2] (t=4, e=6)
[3^{6}; (3^{2}4.3.4)2] (t=4, e=5)	[(3.4^{2}6)2; 3.6.3.6] (t=6, e=8)	[3.4^{2}6; (3.6.3.6)2] (t=4, e=6)	[3.4^{2}6; (3.6.3.6)2] (t=5, e=6)	[3^{2}6^{2}; (3.6.3.6)2] (t=3, e=5)
[(3^{4}6)2; 3.6.3.6] (t=4, e=7)	[(3^{4}6)2; 3.6.3.6] (t=4, e=7)	[3^{3}4^{2}; (4^{4})2] (t=4, e=7)	[(3^{3}4^{2})2; 4^{4}] (t=5, e=7)	[3^{3}4^{2}; (4^{4})2] (t=3, e=6)
[(3^{3}4^{2})2; 4^{4}] (t=4, e=6)	[(3^{3}4^{2})2; 3^{2}4.3.4] (t=5, e=8)	[3^{3}4^{2}; (3^{2}4.3.4)2] (t=6, e=9)	[3^{6}; (3^{3}4^{2})2] (t=5, e=7)	[3^{6}; (3^{3}4^{2})2] (t=4, e=6)
[(3^{6})2; 3^{3}4^{2}] (t=6, e=7)	[(3^{6})2; 3^{3}4^{2}] (t=5, e=6)			

=== 4-uniform tilings ===
There are 151 4-uniform tilings of the Euclidean plane. Brian Galebach's search reproduced Krotenheerdt's list of 33 4-uniform tilings with 4 distinct vertex types, as well as finding 85 of them with 3 vertex types, and 33 with 2 vertex types.

==== 4-uniform tilings, 4 vertex types ====
There are 33 with 4 types of vertices.

4-uniform tilings with 4 vertex types (33)
[33434; 3^{2}6^{2}; 3446; 6^{3}]	[3^{3}4^{2}; 3^{2}6^{2}; 3446; 46.12]	[33434; 3^{2}6^{2}; 3446; 46.12]	[3^{6}; 3^{3}4^{2}; 33434; 334.12]	[3^{6}; 33434; 334.12; 3.12^{2}]
[3^{6}; 33434; 343.12; 3.12^{2}]	[3^{6}; 3^{3}4^{2}; 33434; 3464]	[3^{6}; 3^{3}4^{2}; 33434; 3464]	[3^{6}; 33434; 3464; 3446]	[3^{4}6; 3^{2}6^{2}; 3636; 6^{3}]
[3^{4}6; 3^{2}6^{2}; 3636; 6^{3}]	[334.12; 343.12; 3464; 46.12]	[3^{3}4^{2}; 334.12; 343.12; 3.12^{2}]	[3^{3}4^{2}; 334.12; 343.12; 4^{4}]	[3^{3}4^{2}; 334.12; 343.12; 3.12^{2}]
[3^{6}; 3^{3}4^{2}; 33434; 4^{4}]	[33434; 3^{2}6^{2}; 3464; 3446]	[3^{6}; 3^{3}4^{2}; 3446; 3636]	[3^{6}; 3^{4}6; 3446; 3636]	[3^{6}; 3^{4}6; 3446; 3636]
[3^{6}; 3^{4}6; 3^{3}4^{2}; 3446]	[3^{6}; 3^{4}6; 3^{3}4^{2}; 3446]	[3^{6}; 3^{4}6; 3^{2}6^{2}; 6^{3}]	[3^{6}; 3^{4}6; 3^{2}6^{2}; 6^{3}]	[3^{6}; 3^{4}6; 3^{2}6^{2}; 6^{3}]
[3^{6}; 3^{4}6; 3^{2}6^{2}; 6^{3}]	[3^{6}; 3^{4}6; 3^{2}6^{2}; 3636]	[3^{3}4^{2}; 3^{2}6^{2}; 3446; 6^{3}]	[3^{3}4^{2}; 3^{2}6^{2}; 3446; 6^{3}]	[3^{2}6^{2}; 3446; 3636; 4^{4}]
[3^{2}6^{2}; 3446; 3636; 4^{4}]	[3^{2}6^{2}; 3446; 3636; 4^{4}]	[3^{2}6^{2}; 3446; 3636; 4^{4}]		

==== 4-uniform tilings, 3 vertex types (2:1:1) ====
There are 85 with 3 types of vertices.

4-uniform tilings (2:1:1)
[3464; (3446)^{2}; 46.12]	[3464; 3446; (46.12)^{2}]	[334.12; 3464; (3.12^{2})^{2}]	[343.12; 3464; (3.12^{2})^{2}]	[33434; 343.12; (3464)^{2}]
[(3^{6})^{2}; 3^{3}4^{2}; 334.12]	[(3464)^{2}; 3446; 3636]	[3464; 3446; (3636)^{2}]	[3464; (3446)^{2}; 3636]	[(3^{6})^{2}; 3^{3}4^{2}; 33434]
[(3^{6})^{2}; 3^{3}4^{2}; 33434]	[3^{6}; 3^{2}6^{2}; (6^{3})^{2}]	[3^{6}; 3^{2}6^{2}; (6^{3})^{2}]	[3^{6}; (3^{2}6^{2})^{2}; 6^{3}]	[3^{6}; (3^{2}6^{2})^{2}; 6^{3}]
[3^{6}; 3^{2}6^{2}; (6^{3})^{2}]	[3^{6}; 3^{2}6^{2}; (6^{3})^{2}]	[3^{6}; (3^{4}6)^{2}; 3^{2}6^{2}]	[3^{6}; (3^{2}6^{2})^{2}; 3636]	[(3^{4}6)^{2}; 3^{2}6^{2}; 6^{3}]
[(3^{4}6)^{2}; 3^{2}6^{2}; 6^{3}]	[3^{4}6; 3^{2}6^{2}; (3636)^{2}]	[3^{4}6; 3^{2}6^{2}; (3636)^{2}]	[3^{3}4^{2}; 33434; (3464)^{2}]	[3^{6}; 33434; (3464)^{2}]
[3^{6}; (33434)^{2}; 3464]	[3^{6}; (3^{3}4^{2})^{2}; 3464]	[(3464)^{2}; 3446; 3636]	[3^{4}6; (33434)^{2}; 3446]	[3^{6}; 3^{3}4^{2}; (33434)^{2}]
[3^{6}; 3^{3}4^{2}; (33434)^{2}]	[(3^{3}4^{2})^{2}; 33434; 4^{4}]	[(3^{3}4^{2})^{2}; 33434; 4^{4}]	[3464; (3446)^{2}; 4^{4}]	[33434; (334.12)^{2}; 343.12]
[3^{6}; (3^{2}6^{2})^{2}; 6^{3}]	[3^{6}; (3^{2}6^{2})^{2}; 6^{3}]	[3^{6}; 3^{4}6; (3^{2}6^{2})^{2}]	[(3^{6})^{2}; 3^{4}6; 3^{2}6^{2}]	[(3^{6})^{2}; 3^{4}6; 3^{2}6^{2}]
[(3^{6})^{2}; 3^{4}6; 3636]	[3^{4}6; (3^{2}6^{2})^{2}; 3636]	[3^{4}6; (3^{2}6^{2})^{2}; 3636]	[(3^{4}6)^{2}; 3^{2}6^{2}; 3636]	[(3^{4}6)^{2}; 3^{2}6^{2}; 3636]
[3^{6}; 3^{4}6; (3636)^{2}]	[3^{2}6^{2}; (3636)^{2}; 6^{3}]	[3^{2}6^{2}; (3636)^{2}; 6^{3}]	[(3^{2}6^{2})^{2}; 3636; 6^{3}]	[3^{2}6^{2}; 3636; (6^{3})^{2}]
[3^{4}6; 3^{2}6^{2}; (6^{3})^{2}]	[3^{4}6; (3^{2}6^{2})^{2}; 3636]	[3^{2}6^{2}; 3446; (3636)^{2}]	[3^{2}6^{2}; 3446; (3636)^{2}]	[3^{4}6; (3^{3}4^{2})^{2}; 3636]
[3^{4}6; (3^{3}4^{2})^{2}; 3636]	[3^{4}6; 3^{3}4^{2}; (3446)^{2}]	[3446; 3636; (4^{4})^{2}]	[3446; 3636; (4^{4})^{2}]	[3446; 3636; (4^{4})^{2}]
[3446; 3636; (4^{4})^{2}]	[(3446)^{2}; 3636; 4^{4}]	[(3446)^{2}; 3636; 4^{4}]	[(3446)^{2}; 3636; 4^{4}]	[(3446)^{2}; 3636; 4^{4}]
[(3446)^{2}; 3636; 4^{4}]	[(3446)^{2}; 3636; 4^{4}]	[(3446)^{2}; 3636; 4^{4}]	[(3446)^{2}; 3636; 4^{4}]	[3446; (3636)^{2}; 4^{4}]
[3446; (3636)^{2}; 4^{4}]	[3446; (3636)^{2}; 4^{4}]	[3446; (3636)^{2}; 4^{4}]	[3^{6}; 3^{3}4^{2}; (4^{4})^{2}]	[3^{6}; 3^{3}4^{2}; (4^{4})^{2}]
[3^{6}; (3^{3}4^{2})^{2}; 4^{4}]	[3^{6}; 3^{3}4^{2}; (4^{4})^{2}]	[3^{6}; 3^{3}4^{2}; (4^{4})^{2}]	[3^{6}; (3^{3}4^{2})^{2}; 4^{4}]	[3^{6}; (3^{3}4^{2})^{2}; 4^{4}]
[3^{6}; (3^{3}4^{2})^{2}; 4^{4}]	[(3^{6})^{2}; 3^{3}4^{2}; 4^{4}]	[(3^{6})^{2}; 3^{3}4^{2}; 4^{4}]	[(3^{6})^{2}; 3^{3}4^{2}; 4^{4}]	[(3^{6})^{2}; 3^{3}4^{2}; 4^{4}]

==== 4-uniform tilings, 2 vertex types (2:2) and (3:1) ====
There are 33 with 2 types of vertices, 12 with two pairs of types, and 21 with 3:1 ratio of types.

4-uniform tilings (2:2)
[(3464)^{2}; (46.12)^{2}]	[(33434)^{2}; (3464)^{2}]	[(33434)^{2}; (3464)^{2}]	[(3^{4}6)^{2}; (3636)^{2}]	[(3^{6})^{2}; (3^{4}6)^{2}]
[(3^{3}4^{2})^{2}; (33434)^{2}]	[(3^{3}4^{2})^{2}; (4^{4})^{2}]	[(3^{3}4^{2})^{2}; (4^{4})^{2}]	[(3^{3}4^{2})^{2}; (4^{4})^{2}]	[(3^{6})^{2}; (3^{3}4^{2})^{2}]
[(3^{6})^{2}; (3^{3}4^{2})^{2}]	[(3^{6})^{2}; (3^{3}4^{2})^{2}]			

4-uniform tilings (3:1)
[343.12; (3.12^{2})^{3}]	[(3^{4}6)^{3}; 3636]	[3^{6}; (3^{4}6)^{3}]	[(3^{6})^{3}; 3^{4}6]	[(3^{6})^{3}; 3^{4}6]
[(3^{3}4^{2})^{3}; 33434]	[3^{3}4^{2}; (33434)^{3}]	[3446; (3636)^{3}]	[3446; (3636)^{3}]	[3^{2}6^{2}; (3636)^{3}]
[3^{2}6^{2}; (3636)^{3}]	[3^{3}4^{2}; (4^{4})^{3}]	[3^{3}4^{2}; (4^{4})^{3}]	[(3^{3}4^{2})^{3}; 4^{4}]	[(3^{3}4^{2})^{3}; 4^{4}]
[(3^{3}4^{2})^{3}; 4^{4}]	[3^{6}; (3^{3}4^{2})^{3}]	[3^{6}; (3^{3}4^{2})^{3}]	[3^{6}; (3^{3}4^{2})^{3}]	[(3^{6})^{3}; 3^{3}4^{2}]
[(3^{6})^{3}; 3^{3}4^{2}]

=== 5-uniform tilings ===
There are 332 5-uniform tilings of the Euclidean plane. Brian Galebach's search identified 332 5-uniform tilings, with 2 to 5 types of vertices. There are 74 with 2 vertex types, 149 with 3 vertex types, 94 with 4 vertex types, and 15 with 5 vertex types.

==== 5-uniform tilings, 5 vertex types ====
There are 15 5-uniform tilings with 5 unique vertex figure types.

5-uniform tilings, 5 types
[33434; 3^{2}6^{2}; 3464; 3446; 6^{3}]	[3^{6}; 3^{4}6; 3^{2}6^{2}; 3636; 6^{3}]	[3^{6}; 3^{4}6; 3^{3}4^{2}; 3446; 46.12]	[3^{4}6; 3^{3}4^{2}; 33434; 3446; 4^{4}]	[3^{6}; 33434; 3464; 3446; 3636]
[3^{6}; 3^{4}6; 3464; 3446; 3636]	[33434; 334.12; 3464; 3.12.12; 46.12]	[3^{6}; 3^{4}6; 3446; 3636; 4^{4}]	[3^{6}; 3^{4}6; 3446; 3636; 4^{4}]	[3^{6}; 3^{4}6; 3446; 3636; 4^{4}]
[3^{6}; 3^{4}6; 3446; 3636; 4^{4}]	[3^{6}; 3^{3}4^{2}; 3446; 3636; 4^{4}]	[3^{6}; 3^{4}6; 3^{3}4^{2}; 3446; 4^{4}]	[3^{6}; 3^{3}4^{2}; 3^{2}6^{2}; 3446; 3636]	[3^{6}; 3^{4}6; 3^{3}4^{2}; 3^{2}6^{2}; 3446]

==== 5-uniform tilings, 4 vertex types (2:1:1:1) ====
There are 94 5-uniform tilings with 4 vertex types.

5-uniform tilings (2:1:1:1)
[3^{6}; 33434; (3446)2; 46.12]	[3^{6}; 33434; 3446; (46.12)2]	[3^{6}; 33434; 3464; (46.12)2]	[3^{6}; 3^{3}4^{2}; (334.12)2; 3464]	[3^{6}; (3^{3}4^{2})2; 334.12; 3464]
[3^{6}; 33434; (334.12)2; 3464]	[3^{6}; 33434; 334.12; (3.12.12)2]	[3^{6}; 3^{4}6; (3^{3}4^{2})2; 334.12]	[3^{6}; 33434; 343.12; (3.12.12)2]	[(3^{3}4^{2})2; 334.12; 343.12; 3.12.12]
[(3^{3}4^{2})2; 334.12; 343.12; 3.12.12]	[(3^{3}4^{2})2; 334.12; 343.12; 4^{4}]	[33434; 3^{2}6^{2}; (3446)2; 4^{4}]	[3^{6}; (3^{3}4^{2})2; 33434; 4^{4}]	[3^{4}6; (3^{3}4^{2})2; 33434; 4^{4}]
[3^{6}; 3^{3}4^{2}; (3464)2; 3446]	[3^{3}4^{2}; 3^{2}6^{2}; 3464; (3446)2]	[33434; 3^{2}6^{2}; 3464; (3446)2]	[3^{6}; 33434; (3446)2; 3636]	[3^{3}4^{2}; 33434; 3464; (3446)2]
[3^{6}; 33434; (3^{2}6^{2})2; 3446]	[3^{3}4^{2}; 3^{2}6^{2}; (3464)2; 3446]	[33434; 3^{2}6^{2}; (3464)2; 3446]	[3^{4}6; 3^{3}4^{2}; (3464)2; 3446]	[3^{6}; (3^{3}4^{2})2; 33434; 3464]
[3^{6}; (3^{3}4^{2})2; 33434; 3464]	[3^{6}; 3^{3}4^{2}; (33434)2; 3464]	[(3^{6})2; 3^{3}4^{2}; 33434; 3464]	[3^{6}; 3^{3}4^{2}; (33434)2; 3464]	[(3^{6})2; 3^{3}4^{2}; 33434; 334.12]
[3^{6}; 33434; (334.12)2; 343.12]	[(3^{6})2; 3^{4}6; 3^{3}4^{2}; 33434]	[(3^{6})2; 3^{4}6; 3^{2}6^{2}; 6^{3}]	[3^{6}; (3^{4}6)2; 3^{2}6^{2}; 6^{3}]	[(3^{6})2; 3^{4}6; 3^{2}6^{2}; 3636]
[3^{6}; 3^{4}6; (3^{2}6^{2})2; 3636]	[3^{6}; (3^{4}6)2; 3^{2}6^{2}; 3636]	[(3^{6})2; 3^{4}6; 3^{2}6^{2}; 3636]	[3^{6}; 3^{4}6; 3^{2}6^{2}; (3636)2]	[3^{6}; (3^{4}6)2; 3^{2}6^{2}; 3636]
[3^{6}; (3^{4}6)2; 3^{2}6^{2}; 3636]	[3^{6}; (3^{4}6)2; 3^{2}6^{2}; 3636]	[3^{6}; 3^{4}6; (3^{2}6^{2})2; 3636]	[3^{6}; 3^{4}6; (3^{2}6^{2})2; 3636]	[3^{6}; 3^{4}6; 3^{2}6^{2}; (6^{3})2]
[3^{6}; 3^{4}6; (3^{2}6^{2})2; 6^{3}]	[3^{4}6; (3^{2}6^{2})2; 3636; 6^{3}]	[(3^{4}6)2; 3^{2}6^{2}; 3636; 6^{3}]	[(3^{6})2; 3^{4}6; 3^{2}6^{2}; 6^{3}]	[(3^{6})2; 3^{4}6; 3^{2}6^{2}; 6^{3}]
[3^{6}; 3^{4}6; 3^{2}6^{2}; (6^{3})2]	[3^{6}; 3^{4}6; 3^{2}6^{2}; (6^{3})2]	[3^{6}; 3^{4}6; 3^{2}6^{2}; (6^{3})2]	[3^{6}; 3^{4}6; (3^{2}6^{2})2; 6^{3}]	[3^{4}6; (3^{2}6^{2})2; 3636; 6^{3}]
[3^{4}6; (3^{2}6^{2})2; 3636; 6^{3}]	[3^{4}6; (3^{2}6^{2})2; 3636; 6^{3}]	[3^{4}6; 3^{2}6^{2}; 3636; (6^{3})2]	[3^{4}6; (3^{2}6^{2})2; 3636; 6^{3}]	[3^{3}4^{2}; 3^{2}6^{2}; 3446; (6^{3})2]
[3^{3}4^{2}; 3^{2}6^{2}; 3446; (6^{3})2]	[3^{2}6^{2}; 3446; 3636; (4^{4})2]	[3^{2}6^{2}; 3446; 3636; (4^{4})2]	[3^{2}6^{2}; 3446; (3636)2; 4^{4}]	[3^{2}6^{2}; 3446; (3636)2; 4^{4}]
[3^{3}4^{2}; 3^{2}6^{2}; 3446; (4^{4})2]	[3^{4}6; 3^{3}4^{2}; 3446; (4^{4})2]	[3^{2}6^{2}; 3446; 3636; (4^{4})2]	[3^{2}6^{2}; 3446; 3636; (4^{4})2]	[3^{2}6^{2}; 3446; (3636)2; 4^{4}]
[3^{2}6^{2}; 3446; (3636)2; 4^{4}]	[3^{3}4^{2}; 3^{2}6^{2}; 3446; (4^{4})2]	[3^{4}6; 3^{3}4^{2}; 3446; (4^{4})2]	[3^{4}6; (3^{3}4^{2})2; 3636; 4^{4}]	[3^{6}; 3^{3}4^{2}; (3446)2; 3636]
[3^{4}6; (3^{3}4^{2})2; 3446; 3636]	[3^{4}6; (3^{3}4^{2})2; 3446; 3636]	[(3^{6})2; 3^{4}6; 3446; 3636]	[3^{6}; 3^{3}4^{2}; (3446)2; 3636]	[3^{4}6; (3^{3}4^{2})2; 3446; 3636]
[3^{4}6; (3^{3}4^{2})2; 3446; 3636]	[(3^{6})2; 3^{4}6; 3446; 3636]	[(3^{6})2; 3^{3}4^{2}; 3446; 3636]	[3^{6}; 3^{3}4^{2}; 3446; (3636)2]	[3^{4}6; 3^{3}4^{2}; (3446)2; 3636]
[3^{6}; 3^{4}6; (3^{3}4^{2})2; 3446]	[3^{4}6; (3^{3}4^{2})2; 3^{2}6^{2}; 3636]	[3^{4}6; (3^{3}4^{2})2; 3^{2}6^{2}; 3636]	[3^{6}; (3^{4}6)2; 3^{3}4^{2}; 3446]	[3^{6}; (3^{4}6)2; 3^{3}4^{2}; 3446]
[3^{6}; (3^{4}6)2; 3^{3}4^{2}; 3446]	[3^{6}; 3^{4}6; (3^{3}4^{2})2; 3^{2}6^{2}]	[(3^{6})2; 3^{4}6; 3^{3}4^{2}; 3636]	[(3^{6})2; 3^{4}6; 3^{3}4^{2}; 3636]	

==== 5-uniform tilings, 3 vertex types (3:1:1) and (2:2:1) ====
There are 149 5-uniform tilings, with 60 having 3:1:1 copies, and 89 having 2:2:1 copies.

5-uniform tilings (3:1:1)
[3^{6}; 334.12; (46.12)3]	[3464; 3446; (46.12)3]	[3^{6}; (334.12)3; 46.12]	[334.12; 343.12; (3.12.12)3]	[3^{6}; (33434)3; 343.12]
[3^{2}6^{2}; 3636; (6^{3})3]	[3^{4}6; 3^{2}6^{2}; (6^{3})3]	[3^{6}; (3^{2}6^{2})3; 6^{3}]	[3^{6}; (3^{2}6^{2})3; 6^{3}]	[3^{2}6^{2}; (3636)3; 6^{3}]
[3446; 3636; (4^{4})3]	[3446; 3636; (4^{4})3]	[3^{6}; 3^{3}4^{2}; (4^{4})3]	[3^{6}; 3^{3}4^{2}; (4^{4})3]	[3446; (3636)3; 4^{4}]
[3446; (3636)3; 4^{4}]	[3^{6}; (3^{3}4^{2})3; 4^{4}]	[3^{6}; (3^{3}4^{2})3; 4^{4}]	[3^{6}; (3^{3}4^{2})3; 4^{4}]	[(3^{6})3; 3^{3}4^{2}; 4^{4}]
[(3^{6})3; 3^{3}4^{2}; 4^{4}]	[3446; 3636; (4^{4})3]	[3446; 3636; (4^{4})3]	[3^{6}; 3^{3}4^{2}; (4^{4})3]	[3^{6}; 3^{3}4^{2}; (4^{4})3]
[(3^{3}4^{2})3; 3^{2}6^{2}; 3446]	[3^{2}6^{2}; 3446; (3636)3]	[3^{2}6^{2}; 3446; (3636)3]	[3^{2}6^{2}; 3446; (3636)3]	[3^{2}6^{2}; 3446; (3636)3]
[3446; (3636)3; 4^{4}]	[3446; (3636)3; 4^{4}]	[3^{6}; (3^{3}4^{2})3; 4^{4}]	[3^{6}; (3^{3}4^{2})3; 4^{4}]	[3^{6}; (3^{3}4^{2})3; 4^{4}]
[(3^{6})3; 3^{3}4^{2}; 4^{4}]	[(3^{6})3; 3^{3}4^{2}; 4^{4}]	[3^{6}; (3^{3}4^{2})3; 4^{4}]	[3^{6}; (3^{3}4^{2})3; 4^{4}]	[3^{6}; (3^{3}4^{2})3; 4^{4}]
[(3^{3}4^{2})3; 3446; 3636]	[(3^{3}4^{2})3; 3446; 3636]	[3^{4}6; (3^{3}4^{2})3; 3446]	[(3^{6})3; 3^{4}6; 3^{2}6^{2}]	[(3^{6})3; 3^{4}6; 3^{2}6^{2}]
[(3^{6})3; 3^{4}6; 3^{2}6^{2}]	[3^{4}6; (3^{2}6^{2})3; 3636]	[3^{4}6; (3^{2}6^{2})3; 3636]	[(3^{4}6)3; 3^{2}6^{2}; 3636]	[(3^{4}6)3; 3^{2}6^{2}; 3636]
[(3^{6})3; 3^{4}6; 3^{2}6^{2}]	[(3^{6})3; 3^{4}6; 3^{2}6^{2}]	[(3^{4}6)3; 3^{2}6^{2}; 3636]	[3^{6}; 3^{4}6; (3636)3]	[3^{6}; 3^{4}6; (3636)3]
[3^{6}; 3^{4}6; (3636)3]	[3^{6}; 3^{4}6; (3636)3]	[(3^{6})3; 3^{4}6; 3636]	[(3^{6})3; 3^{4}6; 3636]	[3^{6}; (3^{4}6)3; 3636]

5-uniform tilings (2:2:1)
[(3446)2; (3636)2; 46.12]	[(3^{6})2; (3^{3}4^{2})2; 3464]	[(3^{3}4^{2})2; 334.12; (3464)2]	[3^{6}; (33434)2; (3464)2]	[3^{3}4^{2}; (33434)2; (3464)2]
[3^{3}4^{2}; (33434)2; (3464)2]	[3^{3}4^{2}; (33434)2; (3464)2]	[(33434)2; 343.12; (3464)2]	[3^{6}; (3^{2}6^{2})2; (6^{3})2]	[(3^{2}6^{2})2; (3636)2; 6^{3}]
[(3^{6})2; (3^{3}4^{2})2; 33434]	[(3^{6})2; 3^{3}4^{2}; (33434)2]	[3^{4}6; (3^{3}4^{2})2; (33434)2]	[(3^{6})2; 3^{3}4^{2}; (33434)2]	[(3^{6})2; 3^{3}4^{2}; (33434)2]
[(3^{2}6^{2})2; 3636; (6^{3})2]	[(3446)2; 3636; (4^{4})2]	[(3446)2; 3636; (4^{4})2]	[3446; (3636)2; (4^{4})2]	[(3446)2; 3636; (4^{4})2]
[(3446)2; 3636; (4^{4})2]	[3446; (3636)2; (4^{4})2]	[3^{6}; (3^{3}4^{2})2; (4^{4})2]	[(3^{6})2; 3^{3}4^{2}; (4^{4})2]	[(3^{6})2; 3^{3}4^{2}; (4^{4})2]
[(3446)2; 3636; (4^{4})2]	[(3446)2; 3636; (4^{4})2]	[(3446)2; 3636; (4^{4})2]	[(3446)2; 3636; (4^{4})2]	[(3446)2; 3636; (4^{4})2]
[3^{6}; (3^{3}4^{2})2; (4^{4})2]	[(3^{6})2; (3^{3}4^{2})2; 4^{4}]	[(3446)2; 3636; (4^{4})2]	[(3446)2; 3636; (4^{4})2]	[3446; (3636)2; (4^{4})2]
[(3446)2; 3636; (4^{4})2]	[(3446)2; 3636; (4^{4})2]	[3446; (3636)2; (4^{4})2]	[3^{6}; (3^{3}4^{2})2; (4^{4})2]	[(3^{6})2; 3^{3}4^{2}; (4^{4})2]
[(3^{6})2; 3^{3}4^{2}; (4^{4})2]	[3^{6}; (3^{3}4^{2})2; (4^{4})2]	[3^{6}; (3^{3}4^{2})2; (4^{4})2]	[(3446)2; 3636; (4^{4})2]	[(3^{6})2; (3^{3}4^{2})2; 4^{4}]
[(3^{6})2; (3^{3}4^{2})2; 4^{4}]	[(3^{6})2; (3^{3}4^{2})2; 4^{4}]	[(3^{6})2; (3^{3}4^{2})2; 4^{4}]	[(33434)2; 3^{2}6^{2}; (3446)2]	[3^{3}4^{2}; (3^{2}6^{2})2; (3446)2]
[3^{3}4^{2}; (3^{2}6^{2})2; (3446)2]	[3^{2}6^{2}; (3446)2; (3636)2]	[(3^{2}6^{2})2; 3446; (3636)2]	[(3^{2}6^{2})2; 3446; (3636)2]	[(3464)2; (3446)2; 3636]
[3^{2}6^{2}; (3446)2; (3636)2]	[3^{2}6^{2}; (3446)2; (3636)2]	[(3^{4}6)2; (3446)2; 3636]	[(3^{4}6)2; (3446)2; 3636]	[(3^{4}6)2; (3446)2; 3636]
[(3^{4}6)2; (3446)2; 3636]	[(3^{3}4^{2})2; (3446)2; 3636]	[(3^{3}4^{2})2; (3446)2; 3636]	[(3^{4}6)2; (3^{3}4^{2})2; 3446]	[(3^{4}6)2; 3^{3}4^{2}; (3446)2]
[(3^{6})2; (3^{4}6)2; 3^{2}6^{2}]	[3^{6}; (3^{4}6)2; (3^{2}6^{2})2]	[(3^{6})2; 3^{4}6; (3^{2}6^{2})2]	[(3^{4}6)2; (3^{2}6^{2})2; 6^{3}]	[3^{6}; (3^{2}6^{2})2; (6^{3})2]
[3^{6}; (3^{4}6)2; (3^{2}6^{2})2]	[3^{4}6; (3^{2}6^{2})2; (3636)2]	[(3^{4}6)2; (3^{2}6^{2})2; 3636]	[3^{6}; (3^{4}6)2; (3^{2}6^{2})2]	[(3^{4}6)2; 3^{2}6^{2}; (3636)2]
[(3^{4}6)2; (3^{2}6^{2})2; 3636]	[(3^{6})2; (3^{4}6)2; 3^{2}6^{2}]	[(3^{6})2; (3^{4}6)2; 3^{2}6^{2}]	[(3^{6})2; (3^{4}6)2; 3636]	[(3^{6})2; (3^{4}6)2; 3636]
[3^{6}; (3^{4}6)2; (3^{3}4^{2})2]	[(3^{6})2; (3^{4}6)2; 3^{2}6^{2}]	[3^{6}; (3^{4}6)2; (3^{2}6^{2})2]	[3^{6}; (3^{4}6)2; (3^{2}6^{2})2]	[3^{4}6; (3^{3}4^{2})2; (3636)2]
[3^{4}6; (3^{3}4^{2})2; (3636)2]	[(3^{6})2; 3^{4}6; (3636)2]	[(3^{6})2; (3^{4}6)2; 3636]	[(3^{6})2; 3^{3}4^{2}; (33434)2]	

==== 5-uniform tilings, 2 vertex types (4:1) and (3:2) ====
There are 74 5-uniform tilings with 2 types of vertices, 27 with 4:1 and 47 with 3:2 copies of each.

5-uniform tilings (4:1)
[(3464)4; 46.12]	[343.12; (3.12.12)4]	[3^{6}; (33434)4]	[3^{6}; (33434)4]	[(3^{6})4; 3^{4}6]
[(3^{6})4; 3^{4}6]	[(3^{6})4; 3^{4}6]	[3^{6}; (3^{4}6)4]	[3^{2}6^{2}; (3636)4]	[(3^{4}6)4; 3^{2}6^{2}]
[(3^{4}6)4; 3^{2}6^{2}]	[(3^{4}6)4; 3636]	[3^{2}6^{2}; (3636)4]	[3446; (3636)4]	[3446; (3636)4]
[(3^{3}4^{2})4; 33434]	[3^{3}4^{2}; (33434)4]			
[3^{3}4^{2}; (4^{4})4]	[3^{3}4^{2}; (4^{4})4]	[(3^{3}4^{2})4; 4^{4}]	[(3^{3}4^{2})4; 4^{4}]	[(3^{3}4^{2})4; 4^{4}]
[3^{6}; (3^{3}4^{2})4]	[3^{6}; (3^{3}4^{2})4]	[3^{6}; (3^{3}4^{2})4]	[(3^{6})4; 3^{3}4^{2}]	[(3^{6})4; 3^{3}4^{2}]

There are 29 5-uniform tilings with 3 and 2 unique vertex figure types.

5-uniform tilings (3:2)
[(3464)2; (46.12)3]	[(3464)2; (46.12)3]	[(3464)3; (3446)2]	[(33434)2; (3464)3]	[(33434)3; (3464)2]
[(3^{6})2; (3^{4}6)3]	[(3^{6})2; (3^{4}6)3]	[(3^{6})3; (3^{4}6)2]	[(3^{6})3; (3^{4}6)2]	[(3^{6})3; (3^{4}6)2]
[(3^{6})3; (3^{4}6)2]	[(3^{6})2; (3^{4}6)3]	[(3^{6})2; (3^{4}6)3]	[(3^{6})2; (3^{4}6)3]	
[(3^{2}6^{2})2; (3636)3]	[(3^{4}6)3; (3636)2]	[(3^{4}6)3; (3636)2]	[(3^{4}6)2; (3636)3]	
[(3446)3; (3636)2]	[(3446)2; (3636)3]	[(3446)3; (3636)2]	[(3446)2; (3636)3]	[(3446)2; (3636)3]
[(3^{3}4^{2})3; (33434)2]	[(3^{3}4^{2})3; (33434)2]	[(3^{3}4^{2})2; (33434)3]	[(3^{3}4^{2})2; (33434)3]	
[(3^{3}4^{2})2; (4^{4})3]	[(3^{3}4^{2})2; (4^{4})3]	[(3^{3}4^{2})2; (4^{4})3]	[(3^{3}4^{2})3; (4^{4})2]	[(3^{3}4^{2})2; (4^{4})3]
[(3^{3}4^{2})3; (4^{4})2]	[(3^{3}4^{2})2; (4^{4})3]	[(3^{3}4^{2})2; (4^{4})3]	[(3^{3}4^{2})3; (4^{4})2]	[(3^{3}4^{2})3; (4^{4})2]
[(3^{6})2; (3^{3}4^{2})3]	[(3^{6})2; (3^{3}4^{2})3]	[(3^{6})2; (3^{3}4^{2})3]	[(3^{6})2; (3^{3}4^{2})3]	[(3^{6})3; (3^{3}4^{2})2]
[(3^{6})3; (3^{3}4^{2})2]	[(3^{6})3; (3^{3}4^{2})2]	[(3^{6})3; (3^{3}4^{2})2]	[(3^{6})3; (3^{3}4^{2})2]	[(3^{6})3; (3^{3}4^{2})2]

== Higher k-uniform tilings ==
k-uniform tilings have been enumerated up to 6. There are 673 6-uniform tilings of the Euclidean plane. Brian Galebach's search reproduced Krotenheerdt's list of 10 6-uniform tilings with 6 distinct vertex types, as well as finding 92 of them with 5 vertex types, 187 of them with 4 vertex types, 284 of them with 3 vertex types, and 100 with 2 vertex types.
