= 3-4-3-12 tiling =

Uniform tiling of the plane with regular polygons

3-4-3-12 tiling
Type	2-uniform tiling
Vertex configuration	3.4.3.12 and 3.12.12
Symmetry	p4m, [4,4], (*442)
Rotation symmetry	p4, [4,4]^{+}, (442)
Properties	2-uniform, 3-isohedral, 3-isotoxal

In geometry of the Euclidean plane, the 3-4-3-12 tiling is one of 20 2-uniform tilings of the Euclidean plane by regular polygons, containing regular triangles, squares, and dodecagons, arranged in two vertex configuration: 3.4.3.12 and 3.12.12.

The 3.12.12 vertex figure alone generates a truncated hexagonal tiling, while the 3.4.3.12 only exists in this 2-uniform tiling. There are 2 3-uniform tilings that contain both of these vertex figures among one more.

It has square symmetry, p4m, [4,4], (*442). It is also called a demiregular tiling by some authors.

== Circle Packing ==
This 2-uniform tiling can be used as a circle packing. Cyan circles are in contact with 3 other circles (1 cyan, 2 pink), corresponding to the V3.12^{2} planigon, and pink circles are in contact with 4 other circles (2 cyan, 2 pink), corresponding to the V3.4.3.12 planigon. It is homeomorphic to the ambo operation on the tiling, with the cyan and pink gap polygons corresponding to the cyan and pink circles (one dimensional duals to the respective planigons). Both images coincide.

Circle Packing	Ambo

== Dual tiling ==
The dual tiling has kite ('ties') and isosceles triangle faces, defined by face configurations: V3.4.3.12 and V3.12.12. The kites meet in sets of 4 around a center vertex, and the triangles are in pairs making planigon rhombi. Every four kites and four isosceles triangles make a square of side length $2+\sqrt{3}$.

Dual tiling	V3.4.3.12; Semiplanigon V3.12.12; Planigon

This is one of the only dual uniform tilings which only uses planigons (and semiplanigons) containing a 30° angle. Conversely, 3.4.3.12; 3.12^{2} is one of the only uniform tilings in which every vertex is contained on a dodecagon.

== Related tilings ==
It has 2 related 3-uniform tilings that include both 3.4.3.12 and 3.12.12 vertex figures:

3.4.3.12, 3.12.12, 3.4.6.4	3.4.3.12, 3.12.12, 3.3.4.12
V3.4.3.12, V3.12.12, V3.4.6.4	V3.4.3.12, V3.12.12, V3.3.4.12

This tiling can be seen in a series as a lattice of 4n-gons starting from the square tiling. For 16-gons (n=4), the gaps can be filled with isogonal octagons and isosceles triangles.

4	8	12	16	20
Square tiling Q	Truncated square tiling tQ	3-4-3-12 tiling	Twice-truncated square tiling ttQ	20-gons, squares trapezoids, triangles
