= Euclidean tilings by convex regular polygons =

Subdivision of the plane into polygons that are all regular

Example periodic tilings
A regular tiling has one type of regular face.	A semiregular or uniform tiling has one type of vertex, but two or more types of faces.
A k-uniform tiling has k types of vertices, and two or more types of regular faces.	A non-edge-to-edge tiling can have different-sized regular faces.

Tilings of the Euclidean plane by convex regular polygons have been widely used since antiquity. The first systematic mathematical treatment was that of Kepler in his Harmonice Mundi (Latin: The Harmony of the World, 1619).

== Notation of Euclidean tilings ==
Euclidean tilings are usually named after Cundy & Rollett's notation. This notation represents (i) the number of vertices, (ii) the number of polygons around each vertex (arranged clockwise) and (iii) the number of sides to each of those polygons. For example: 3^{6}; 3^{6}; 3^{4}.6, tells us there are 3 vertices with 2 different vertex types, so this tiling would be classed as a "3-uniform (2-vertex types)" tiling. Broken down, 3^{6}; 3^{6} (both of different transitivity class), or (3^{6})^{2}, tells us that there are 2 vertices (denoted by the superscript 2), each with 6 equilateral 3-sided polygons (triangles). With a final vertex 3^{4}.6, 4 more contiguous equilateral triangles and a single regular hexagon.

However, this notation has two main problems related to ambiguous conformation and uniqueness. First, when it comes to k-uniform tilings, the notation does not explain the relationships between the vertices. This makes it impossible to generate a covered plane given the notation alone. And second, some tessellations have the same nomenclature, they are very similar but it can be noticed that the relative positions of the hexagons are different. Therefore, the second problem is that this nomenclature is not unique for each tessellation.

In order to solve those problems, GomJau-Hogg's notation is a slightly modified version of the research and notation presented in 2012, about the generation and nomenclature of tessellations and double-layer grids. Antwerp v3.0, a free online application, allows for the infinite generation of regular polygon tilings through a set of shape placement stages and iterative rotation and reflection operations, obtained directly from the GomJau-Hogg's notation.

== Regular tilings ==
Following Grünbaum and Shephard (section 1.3), a tiling is said to be regular if the symmetry group of the tiling acts transitively on the flags of the tiling, where a flag is a triple consisting of a mutually incident vertex, edge and tile of the tiling. This means that, for every pair of flags, there is a symmetry operation mapping the first flag to the second. This is equivalent to the tiling being an edge-to-edge tiling by congruent regular polygons. There must be six equilateral triangles, four squares or three regular hexagons at a vertex, yielding the three regular tessellations.

Regular tilings (3)
p6m, *632		p4m, *442
C&R: 3^{6} GJ-H: 3/m30/r(h2) (t = 1, e = 1)	C&R: 6^{3} GJ-H: 6/m30/r(h1) (t = 1, e = 1)	C&R: 4^{4} GJ-H: 4/m45/r(h1) (t = 1, e = 1)

C&R: Cundy & Rollet's notation
GJ-H: Notation of GomJau-Hogg

== Archimedean, uniform or semiregular tilings ==
Vertex-transitivity means that for every pair of vertices there is a symmetry operation mapping the first vertex to the second.

If the requirement of flag-transitivity is relaxed to one of vertex-transitivity, while the condition that the tiling is edge-to-edge is kept, there are eight additional tilings possible, known as Archimedean, uniform or semiregular tilings. Note that there are two mirror image (enantiomorphic or chiral) forms of 3^{4}.6 (snub hexagonal) tiling, only one of which is shown in the following table. All other regular and semiregular tilings are achiral.

Uniform tilings (8)
p6m, *632
C&R: 3.12^{2} GJ-H: 12-3/m30/r(h3) (t = 2, e = 2) t{6,3}	C&R: 3.4.6.4; GJ-H: 6-4-3/m30/r(c2) (t = 3, e = 2) rr{3,6}	C&R: 4.6.12; GJ-H: 12-6,4/m30/r(c2) (t = 3, e = 3) tr{3,6}	C&R: (3.6)^{2} GJ-H: 6-3-6/m30/r(v4) (t = 2, e = 1) r{6,3}
C&R: 4.8^{2} GJ-H: 8-4/m90/r(h4) (t = 2, e = 2) t{4,4}	C&R: 3^{2}.4.3.4; GJ-H: 4-3-3,4/r90/r(h2) (t = 2, e = 2) s{4,4}	C&R: 3^{3}.4^{2} GJ-H: 4-3/m90/r(h2) (t = 2, e = 3) {3,6}:e	C&R: 3^{4}.6; GJ-H: 6-3-3/r60/r(h5) (t = 3, e = 3) sr{3,6}

C&R: Cundy & Rollet's notation
GJ-H: Notation of GomJau-Hogg

Grünbaum and Shephard distinguish the description of these tilings as Archimedean as referring only to the local property of the arrangement of tiles around each vertex being the same, and that as uniform as referring to the global property of vertex-transitivity. Though these yield the same set of tilings in the plane, in other spaces there are Archimedean tilings which are not uniform.

== Plane-vertex tilings ==
There are 17 combinations of regular convex polygons that form 21 types of plane-vertex tilings. Polygons in these meet at a point with no gap or overlap. Listing by their vertex figures, one has 6 polygons, three have 5 polygons, seven have 4 polygons, and ten have 3 polygons.

Three of them can make regular tilings (6^{3}, 4^{4}, 3^{6}), and eight more can make semiregular or archimedean tilings, (3.12^{2}, 4.6.12, 4.8^{2}, (3.6)^{2}, 3.4.6.4, 3^{2}.4.3.4, 3^{3}.4^{2}, 3^{4}.6). Four of them can exist in higher k-uniform tilings (3^{2}.4.12, 3.4.3.12, 3^{2}.6^{2}, 3.4^{2}.6), while six can not be used to completely tile the plane by regular polygons with no gaps or overlaps – they only tessellate space entirely when irregular polygons are included (3.7.42, 3.8.24, 3.9.18, 3.10.15, 4.5.20, 5^{2}.10).

Plane-vertex tilings
6	3^{6}									
5	3^{2}.4.3.4	3^{3}.4^{2}	3^{4}.6							
4	3^{2}.4.12	3.4.3.12	3^{2}.6^{2}	(3.6)^{2}	3.4^{2}.6	3.4.6.4	4^{4}			
3	3.7.42	3.8.24	3.9.18	3.10.15	3.12^{2}	4.5.20	4.6.12	4.8^{2}	5^{2}.10	6^{3}

== k-uniform tilings ==
Such periodic tilings may be classified by the number of orbits of vertices, edges and tiles. If there are k orbits of vertices, a tiling is known as k-uniform or k-isogonal; if there are t orbits of tiles, as t-isohedral; if there are e orbits of edges, as e-isotoxal.

k-uniform tilings with the same vertex figures can be further identified by their wallpaper group symmetry.

1-uniform tilings include 3 regular tilings, and 8 semiregular ones, with 2 or more types of regular polygon faces. There are 20 2-uniform tilings, 61 3-uniform tilings, 151 4-uniform tilings, 332 5-uniform tilings and 673 6-uniform tilings. Each can be grouped by the number m of distinct vertex figures, which are also called m-Archimedean tilings.

Finally, if the number of types of vertices is the same as the uniformity (m = k below), then the tiling is said to be Krotenheerdt. In general, the uniformity is greater than or equal to the number of types of vertices (m ≥ k), as different types of vertices necessarily have different orbits, but not vice versa. Setting m = n = k, there are 11 such tilings for n = 1; 20 such tilings for n = 2; 39 such tilings for n = 3; 33 such tilings for n = 4; 15 such tilings for n = 5; 10 such tilings for n = 6; and 7 such tilings for n = 7.

Below is an example of a 3-unifom tiling:

Colored 3-uniform tiling #57 of 61
by sides, yellow triangles, red squares (by polygons)	by 4-isohedral positions, 3 shaded colors of triangles (by orbits)

k-uniform, m-Archimedean tiling counts
		m-Archimedean															
		1	2	3	4	5	6	7	8	9	10	11	12	13	14	≥ 15	Total
k-uniform	1	11	0	0	0	0	0	0	0	0	0	0	0	0	0	0	11
k-uniform	2	0	20	0	0	0	0	0	0	0	0	0	0	0	0	0	20
k-uniform	3	0	22	39	0	0	0	0	0	0	0	0	0	0	0	0	61
k-uniform	4	0	33	85	33	0	0	0	0	0	0	0	0	0	0	0	151
k-uniform	5	0	74	149	94	15	0	0	0	0	0	0	0	0	0	0	332
k-uniform	6	0	100	284	187	92	10	0	0	0	0	0	0	0	0	0	673
k-uniform	7	0	175	572	426	218	74	7	0	0	0	0	0	0	0	0	1472
k-uniform	8	0	298	1037	795	537	203	20	0	0	0	0	0	0	0	0	2850
k-uniform	9	0	424	1992	1608	1278	570	80	8	0	0	0	0	0	0	0	5960
k-uniform	10	0	663	3772	2979	2745	1468	212	27	0	0	0	0	0	0	0	11866
k-uniform	11	0	1086	7171	5798	5993	3711	647	52	1	0	0	0	0	0	0	24459
k-uniform	12	0	1607	13762	11006	12309	9230	1736	129	15	0	0	0	0	0	0	49794
k-uniform	13	0	?	?	?	?	?	?	?	?	?	0	0	0	0	0	103082
k-uniform	14	0	?	?	?	?	?	?	?	?	?	0	0	0	0	0	?
k-uniform	≥ 15	0	?	?	?	?	?	?	?	?	?	?	?	?	?	0	?
k-uniform	Total	11	∞	∞	∞	∞	∞	∞	∞	∞	∞	∞	∞	∞	∞	0	∞

=== 2-uniform tilings ===
There are twenty (20) 2-uniform tilings of the Euclidean plane. (also called 2-isogonal tilings or demiregular tilings) Vertex types are listed for each. If two tilings share the same two vertex types, they are given subscripts 1,2.

2-uniform tilings (20)
p6m, *632						p4m, *442
[3^{6}; 3^{2}.4.3.4] 3-4-3/m30/r(c3) (t = 3, e = 3)	[3.4.6.4; 3^{2}.4.3.4] 6-4-3,3/m30/r(h1) (t = 4, e = 4)	[3.4.6.4; 3^{3}.4^{2}] 6-4-3-3/m30/r(h5) (t = 4, e = 4)	[3.4.6.4; 3.4^{2}.6] 6-4-3,4-6/m30/r(c4) (t = 5, e = 5)	[4.6.12; 3.4.6.4] 12-4,6-3/m30/r(c3) (t = 4, e = 4)	[3^{6}; 3^{2}.4.12] 12-3,4-3/m30/r(c3) (t = 4, e = 4)	[3.12.12; 3.4.3.12] 12-0,3,3-0,4/m45/m(h1) (t = 3, e = 3)
p6m, *632	p6, 632	p6, 632	cmm, 2*22	pmm, *2222	cmm, 2*22	pmm, *2222
[3^{6}; 3^{2}.6^{2}] 3-6/m30/r(c2) (t = 2, e = 3)	[3^{6}; 3^{4}.6]_{1} 6-3,3-3/m30/r(h1) (t = 3, e = 3)	[3^{6}; 3^{4}.6]_{2} 6-3-3,3-3/r60/r(h8) (t = 5, e = 7)	[3^{2}.6^{2}; 3^{4}.6] 6-3/m90/r(h1) (t = 2, e = 4)	[3.6.3.6; 3^{2}.6^{2}] 6-3,6/m90/r(h3) (t = 2, e = 3)	[3.4^{2}.6; 3.6.3.6]_{2} 6-3,4-6-3,4-6,4/m90/r(c6) (t = 3, e = 4)	[3.4^{2}.6; 3.6.3.6]_{1} 6-3,4/m90/r(h4) (t = 4, e = 4)
p4g, 4*2	pgg, 22×	cmm, 2*22	cmm, 2*22	pmm, *2222	cmm, 2*22	
[3^{3}.4^{2}; 3^{2}.4.3.4]_{1} 4-3,3-4,3/r90/m(h3) (t = 4, e = 5)	[3^{3}.4^{2}; 3^{2}.4.3.4]_{2} 4-3,3,3-4,3/r(c2)/r(h13)/r(h45) (t = 3, e = 6)	[4^{4}; 3^{3}.4^{2}]_{1} 4-3/m(h4)/m(h3)/r(h2) (t = 2, e = 4)	[4^{4}; 3^{3}.4^{2}]_{2} 4-4-3-3/m90/r(h3) (t = 3, e = 5)	[3^{6}; 3^{3}.4^{2}]_{1} 4-3,4-3,3/m90/r(h3) (t = 3, e = 4)	[3^{6}; 3^{3}.4^{2}]_{2} 4-3-3-3/m90/r(h7)/r(h5) (t = 4, e = 5)	

== Higher k-uniform tilings ==
k-uniform tilings have been enumerated up to 6. There are 673 6-uniform tilings of the Euclidean plane. Brian Galebach's search reproduced Krotenheerdt's list of 10 6-uniform tilings with 6 distinct vertex types, as well as finding 92 of them with 5 vertex types, 187 of them with 4 vertex types, 284 of them with 3 vertex types, and 100 with 2 vertex types.

=== Fractalizing k-uniform tilings ===
There are many ways of generating new k-uniform tilings from old k-uniform tilings. For example, notice that the 2-uniform [3.12.12; 3.4.3.12] tiling has a square lattice, the 4(3-1)-uniform [343.12; (3.12^{2})3] tiling has a snub square lattice, and the 5(3-1-1)-uniform [334.12; 343.12; (3.12.12)3] tiling has an elongated triangular lattice. These higher-order uniform tilings use the same lattice but possess greater complexity. The fractalizing basis for theses tilings is as follows:

	Triangle	Square	Hexagon	Dissected Dodecagon
Shape				
Fractalizing				

The side lengths are dilated by a factor of $2+\sqrt{3}$.

This can similarly be done with the truncated trihexagonal tiling as a basis, with corresponding dilation of $3+\sqrt{3}$.

	Triangle	Square	Hexagon	Dissected Dodecagon
Shape				
Fractalizing				

==== Fractalizing examples ====
	Truncated Hexagonal Tiling	Truncated Trihexagonal Tiling
Fractalizing		

== Tilings that are not edge-to-edge ==
Convex regular polygons can also form plane tilings that are not edge-to-edge. Such tilings can be considered edge-to-edge as nonregular polygons with adjacent colinear edges.

There are seven families of isogonal figures, each family having a real-valued parameter determining the overlap between sides of adjacent tiles or the ratio between the edge lengths of different tiles. Two of the families are generated from shifted square, either progressive or zig-zagging positions. Grünbaum and Shephard call these tilings uniform although it contradicts Coxeter's definition for uniformity which requires edge-to-edge regular polygons. Such isogonal tilings are actually topologically identical to the uniform tilings, with different geometric proportions.

Periodic isogonal tilings by non-edge-to-edge convex regular polygons
1	2	3	4	5	6	7
Rows of squares with horizontal offsets		Rows of triangles with horizontal offsets	A tiling by squares	Three hexagons surround each triangle	Six triangles surround every hexagon.	Three size triangles
cmm (2*22)	p2 (2222)	cmm (2*22)	p4m (*442)	p6 (632)		p3 (333)
Hexagonal tiling		Square tiling	Truncated square tiling	Truncated hexagonal tiling	Hexagonal tiling	Trihexagonal tiling

== See also ==
- Grid (spatial index)
- Hyperbolic geometry
- Lattice (group)
- List of uniform tilings
- Penrose tiling
- Regular polyhedron (the Platonic solids)
- Semiregular polyhedron (including the Archimedean solids)
- Tessellation
- Tiling with rectangles
- Uniform tilings in hyperbolic plane
- Wallpaper group
- Wythoff symbol
