= Snub square tiling =

Semiregular tiling of the plane

Snub square tiling
Snub square tiling
Type	Semiregular tiling
Vertex configuration	3.3.4.3.4
Schläfli symbol	s{4,4} sr{4,4} or $s\begin{Bmatrix} 4 \\ 4 \end{Bmatrix}$
Wythoff symbol	| 4 4 2
Coxeter diagram	or
Symmetry	p4g, [4^{+},4], (4*2)
Rotation symmetry	p4, [4,4]^{+}, (442)
Bowers acronym	Snasquat
Dual	Cairo pentagonal tiling
Properties	Vertex-transitive

In geometry, the snub square tiling is a semiregular tiling of the Euclidean plane. There are three triangles and two squares on each vertex. Its Schläfli symbol is s{4,4}.

Conway calls it a snub quadrille, constructed by a snub operation applied to a square tiling (quadrille).

There are 3 regular and 8 semiregular tilings in the plane.

== Uniform colorings ==
There are two distinct uniform colorings of a snub square tiling. (Naming the colors by indices around a vertex (3.3.4.3.4): 11212, 11213.)

Coloring	11212	11213
Symmetry	4*2, [4^{+},4], (p4g)	442, [4,4]^{+}, (p4)
Schläfli symbol	s{4,4}	sr{4,4}
Wythoff symbol		| 4 4 2
Coxeter diagram		

== Circle packing ==
The snub square tiling can be used as a circle packing, placing equal diameter circles at the center of every point. Every circle is in contact with 5 other circles in the packing (kissing number).

== Wythoff construction ==
The snub square tiling can be constructed as a snub operation from the square tiling, or as an alternate truncation from the truncated square tiling.

An alternate truncation deletes every other vertex, creating a new triangular faces at the removed vertices, and reduces the original faces to half as many sides. In this case starting with a truncated square tiling with 2 octagons and 1 square per vertex, the octagon faces into squares, and the square faces degenerate into edges and 2 new triangles appear at the truncated vertices around the original square.

If the original tiling is made of regular faces the new triangles will be isosceles. Starting with octagons which alternate long and short edge lengths, derived from a regular dodecagon, will produce a snub tiling with perfect equilateral triangle faces.

Example:

Regular octagons alternately truncated	→ (Alternate truncation)	Isosceles triangles (Nonuniform tiling)
Nonregular octagons alternately truncated	→ (Alternate truncation)	Equilateral triangles

== Related tilings ==
A snub operator applied twice to the square tiling, while it doesn't have regular faces, is made of square with irregular triangles and pentagons.

A related isogonal tiling that combines pairs of triangles into rhombi

A 2-isogonal tiling can be made by combining 2 squares and 3 triangles into heptagons.

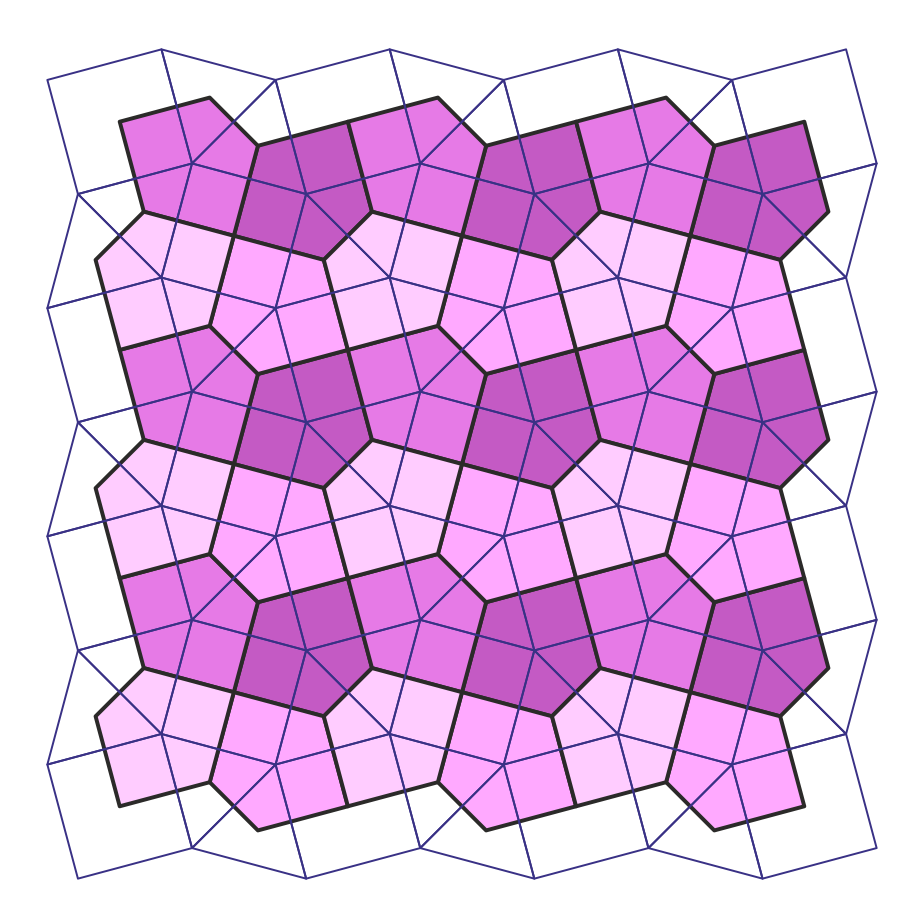
The Cairo pentagonal tiling is dual to the snub square tiling.

=== Related k-uniform tilings ===
This tiling is related to the elongated triangular tiling which also has 3 triangles and two squares on a vertex, but in a different order, 3.3.3.4.4. The two vertex figures can be mixed in many k-uniform tilings.

Related tilings of triangles and squares
snub square	elongated triangular	2-uniform		3-uniform	
p4g, (4*2)	p2, (2222)	p2, (2222)	cmm, (2*22)	p2, (2222)	
[3^{2}434]	[3^{3}4^{2}]	[3^{3}4^{2}; 3^{2}434]	[3^{3}4^{2}; 3^{2}434]	[2: 3^{3}4^{2}; 3^{2}434]	[3^{3}4^{2}; 2: 3^{2}434]

=== Related topological series of polyhedra and tiling ===
The snub square tiling is third in a series of snub polyhedra and tilings with vertex figure 3.3.4.3.n.

4n2 symmetry mutations of snub tilings: 3.3.4.3.n
Symmetry 4n2	Spherical		Euclidean	Compact hyperbolic				Paracomp.
Symmetry 4n2	242	342	442	542	642	742	842	∞42
Snub figures								
Config.	3.3.4.3.2	3.3.4.3.3	3.3.4.3.4	3.3.4.3.5	3.3.4.3.6	3.3.4.3.7	3.3.4.3.8	3.3.4.3.∞
Gyro figures								
Config.	V3.3.4.3.2	V3.3.4.3.3	V3.3.4.3.4	V3.3.4.3.5	V3.3.4.3.6	V3.3.4.3.7	V3.3.4.3.8	V3.3.4.3.∞

The snub square tiling is third in a series of snub polyhedra and tilings with vertex figure 3.3.n.3.n.

4n2 symmetry mutations of snub tilings: 3.3.n.3.n
Symmetry 4n2	Spherical		Euclidean	Compact hyperbolic				Paracompact
Symmetry 4n2	222	322	442	552	662	772	882	∞∞2
Snub figures								
Config.	3.3.2.3.2	3.3.3.3.3	3.3.4.3.4	3.3.5.3.5	3.3.6.3.6	3.3.7.3.7	3.3.8.3.8	3.3.∞.3.∞
Gyro figures								
Config.	V3.3.2.3.2	V3.3.3.3.3	V3.3.4.3.4	V3.3.5.3.5	V3.3.6.3.6	V3.3.7.3.7	V3.3.8.3.8	V3.3.∞.3.∞

Uniform tilings based on square tiling symmetry
Symmetry: [4,4], (*442)							[4,4]^{+}, (442)	[4,4^{+}], (4*2)
{4,4}	t{4,4}	r{4,4}	t{4,4}	{4,4}	rr{4,4}	tr{4,4}	sr{4,4}	s{4,4}
Uniform duals
V4.4.4.4	V4.8.8	V4.4.4.4	V4.8.8	V4.4.4.4	V4.4.4.4	V4.8.8	V3.3.4.3.4	

== See also ==
- List of uniform planar tilings
- Snub (geometry)
- Snub square prismatic honeycomb
- Tilings of regular polygons
- Elongated triangular tiling
